

151001–151100 

|-bgcolor=#E9E9E9
| 151001 ||  || — || October 17, 2001 || Socorro || LINEAR || HEN || align=right | 1.8 km || 
|-id=002 bgcolor=#E9E9E9
| 151002 ||  || — || October 17, 2001 || Socorro || LINEAR || — || align=right | 1.3 km || 
|-id=003 bgcolor=#E9E9E9
| 151003 ||  || — || October 17, 2001 || Socorro || LINEAR || KON || align=right | 4.2 km || 
|-id=004 bgcolor=#fefefe
| 151004 ||  || — || October 17, 2001 || Socorro || LINEAR || NYS || align=right data-sort-value="0.86" | 860 m || 
|-id=005 bgcolor=#E9E9E9
| 151005 ||  || — || October 20, 2001 || Socorro || LINEAR || — || align=right | 2.5 km || 
|-id=006 bgcolor=#E9E9E9
| 151006 ||  || — || October 17, 2001 || Haleakala || NEAT || — || align=right | 2.4 km || 
|-id=007 bgcolor=#E9E9E9
| 151007 ||  || — || October 17, 2001 || Socorro || LINEAR || — || align=right | 1.6 km || 
|-id=008 bgcolor=#E9E9E9
| 151008 ||  || — || October 20, 2001 || Socorro || LINEAR || MAR || align=right | 1.7 km || 
|-id=009 bgcolor=#E9E9E9
| 151009 ||  || — || October 20, 2001 || Socorro || LINEAR || — || align=right | 2.4 km || 
|-id=010 bgcolor=#E9E9E9
| 151010 ||  || — || October 20, 2001 || Socorro || LINEAR || MAR || align=right | 1.9 km || 
|-id=011 bgcolor=#E9E9E9
| 151011 ||  || — || October 20, 2001 || Socorro || LINEAR || — || align=right | 2.3 km || 
|-id=012 bgcolor=#E9E9E9
| 151012 ||  || — || October 18, 2001 || Palomar || NEAT || — || align=right | 2.9 km || 
|-id=013 bgcolor=#E9E9E9
| 151013 ||  || — || October 20, 2001 || Socorro || LINEAR || — || align=right | 1.5 km || 
|-id=014 bgcolor=#E9E9E9
| 151014 ||  || — || October 21, 2001 || Socorro || LINEAR || — || align=right | 1.9 km || 
|-id=015 bgcolor=#E9E9E9
| 151015 ||  || — || October 21, 2001 || Socorro || LINEAR || — || align=right | 2.7 km || 
|-id=016 bgcolor=#E9E9E9
| 151016 ||  || — || October 22, 2001 || Socorro || LINEAR || — || align=right | 3.1 km || 
|-id=017 bgcolor=#E9E9E9
| 151017 ||  || — || October 22, 2001 || Socorro || LINEAR || — || align=right | 2.0 km || 
|-id=018 bgcolor=#E9E9E9
| 151018 ||  || — || October 22, 2001 || Socorro || LINEAR || — || align=right | 2.5 km || 
|-id=019 bgcolor=#fefefe
| 151019 ||  || — || October 22, 2001 || Socorro || LINEAR || SUL || align=right | 3.9 km || 
|-id=020 bgcolor=#E9E9E9
| 151020 ||  || — || October 22, 2001 || Socorro || LINEAR || — || align=right | 2.6 km || 
|-id=021 bgcolor=#E9E9E9
| 151021 ||  || — || October 22, 2001 || Palomar || NEAT || ADE || align=right | 4.7 km || 
|-id=022 bgcolor=#E9E9E9
| 151022 ||  || — || October 23, 2001 || Palomar || NEAT || — || align=right | 2.4 km || 
|-id=023 bgcolor=#E9E9E9
| 151023 ||  || — || October 17, 2001 || Socorro || LINEAR || — || align=right | 2.7 km || 
|-id=024 bgcolor=#fefefe
| 151024 ||  || — || October 17, 2001 || Socorro || LINEAR || V || align=right | 1.4 km || 
|-id=025 bgcolor=#E9E9E9
| 151025 ||  || — || October 23, 2001 || Socorro || LINEAR || — || align=right | 3.8 km || 
|-id=026 bgcolor=#d6d6d6
| 151026 ||  || — || October 23, 2001 || Socorro || LINEAR || — || align=right | 3.4 km || 
|-id=027 bgcolor=#E9E9E9
| 151027 ||  || — || October 23, 2001 || Socorro || LINEAR || — || align=right | 2.4 km || 
|-id=028 bgcolor=#d6d6d6
| 151028 ||  || — || October 23, 2001 || Socorro || LINEAR || — || align=right | 3.0 km || 
|-id=029 bgcolor=#E9E9E9
| 151029 ||  || — || October 23, 2001 || Socorro || LINEAR || — || align=right | 4.5 km || 
|-id=030 bgcolor=#E9E9E9
| 151030 ||  || — || October 23, 2001 || Socorro || LINEAR || — || align=right | 1.4 km || 
|-id=031 bgcolor=#E9E9E9
| 151031 ||  || — || October 19, 2001 || Socorro || LINEAR || — || align=right | 3.7 km || 
|-id=032 bgcolor=#E9E9E9
| 151032 ||  || — || October 19, 2001 || Socorro || LINEAR || IAN || align=right | 2.2 km || 
|-id=033 bgcolor=#E9E9E9
| 151033 ||  || — || October 21, 2001 || Socorro || LINEAR || — || align=right | 1.9 km || 
|-id=034 bgcolor=#E9E9E9
| 151034 ||  || — || October 18, 2001 || Palomar || NEAT || — || align=right | 1.6 km || 
|-id=035 bgcolor=#E9E9E9
| 151035 ||  || — || October 26, 2001 || Haleakala || NEAT || JUN || align=right | 1.6 km || 
|-id=036 bgcolor=#fefefe
| 151036 ||  || — || October 16, 2001 || Palomar || NEAT || — || align=right | 2.2 km || 
|-id=037 bgcolor=#E9E9E9
| 151037 ||  || — || October 16, 2001 || Socorro || LINEAR || — || align=right | 2.2 km || 
|-id=038 bgcolor=#fefefe
| 151038 ||  || — || October 18, 2001 || Palomar || NEAT || NYS || align=right data-sort-value="0.99" | 990 m || 
|-id=039 bgcolor=#E9E9E9
| 151039 ||  || — || October 19, 2001 || Palomar || NEAT || — || align=right | 1.8 km || 
|-id=040 bgcolor=#fefefe
| 151040 ||  || — || October 19, 2001 || Palomar || NEAT || — || align=right | 1.5 km || 
|-id=041 bgcolor=#E9E9E9
| 151041 ||  || — || October 19, 2001 || Palomar || NEAT || — || align=right | 1.4 km || 
|-id=042 bgcolor=#E9E9E9
| 151042 ||  || — || October 19, 2001 || Palomar || NEAT || — || align=right | 1.6 km || 
|-id=043 bgcolor=#E9E9E9
| 151043 ||  || — || October 19, 2001 || Palomar || NEAT || — || align=right | 2.4 km || 
|-id=044 bgcolor=#E9E9E9
| 151044 ||  || — || October 19, 2001 || Palomar || NEAT || — || align=right | 3.3 km || 
|-id=045 bgcolor=#d6d6d6
| 151045 ||  || — || October 24, 2001 || Socorro || LINEAR || — || align=right | 3.9 km || 
|-id=046 bgcolor=#E9E9E9
| 151046 ||  || — || October 18, 2001 || Kitt Peak || Spacewatch || — || align=right | 1.8 km || 
|-id=047 bgcolor=#E9E9E9
| 151047 ||  || — || October 19, 2001 || Socorro || LINEAR || — || align=right | 2.6 km || 
|-id=048 bgcolor=#E9E9E9
| 151048 ||  || — || October 21, 2001 || Socorro || LINEAR || — || align=right | 1.9 km || 
|-id=049 bgcolor=#E9E9E9
| 151049 ||  || — || October 23, 2001 || Socorro || LINEAR || MIS || align=right | 3.2 km || 
|-id=050 bgcolor=#E9E9E9
| 151050 ||  || — || October 24, 2001 || Kitt Peak || Spacewatch || — || align=right | 2.8 km || 
|-id=051 bgcolor=#E9E9E9
| 151051 ||  || — || October 25, 2001 || Socorro || LINEAR || — || align=right | 2.0 km || 
|-id=052 bgcolor=#E9E9E9
| 151052 ||  || — || November 9, 2001 || Palomar || NEAT || — || align=right | 1.8 km || 
|-id=053 bgcolor=#E9E9E9
| 151053 ||  || — || November 9, 2001 || Socorro || LINEAR || — || align=right | 2.2 km || 
|-id=054 bgcolor=#E9E9E9
| 151054 ||  || — || November 9, 2001 || Socorro || LINEAR || — || align=right | 1.6 km || 
|-id=055 bgcolor=#E9E9E9
| 151055 ||  || — || November 10, 2001 || Socorro || LINEAR || — || align=right | 2.4 km || 
|-id=056 bgcolor=#d6d6d6
| 151056 ||  || — || November 10, 2001 || Socorro || LINEAR || — || align=right | 4.7 km || 
|-id=057 bgcolor=#E9E9E9
| 151057 ||  || — || November 10, 2001 || Socorro || LINEAR || — || align=right | 2.9 km || 
|-id=058 bgcolor=#E9E9E9
| 151058 ||  || — || November 10, 2001 || Socorro || LINEAR || — || align=right | 3.2 km || 
|-id=059 bgcolor=#E9E9E9
| 151059 ||  || — || November 9, 2001 || Socorro || LINEAR || — || align=right | 1.4 km || 
|-id=060 bgcolor=#E9E9E9
| 151060 ||  || — || November 9, 2001 || Socorro || LINEAR || — || align=right | 5.5 km || 
|-id=061 bgcolor=#E9E9E9
| 151061 ||  || — || November 9, 2001 || Socorro || LINEAR || — || align=right | 3.4 km || 
|-id=062 bgcolor=#E9E9E9
| 151062 ||  || — || November 9, 2001 || Socorro || LINEAR || — || align=right | 1.9 km || 
|-id=063 bgcolor=#E9E9E9
| 151063 ||  || — || November 9, 2001 || Socorro || LINEAR || — || align=right | 2.0 km || 
|-id=064 bgcolor=#E9E9E9
| 151064 ||  || — || November 9, 2001 || Socorro || LINEAR || — || align=right | 3.6 km || 
|-id=065 bgcolor=#E9E9E9
| 151065 ||  || — || November 9, 2001 || Socorro || LINEAR || — || align=right | 3.0 km || 
|-id=066 bgcolor=#d6d6d6
| 151066 ||  || — || November 9, 2001 || Socorro || LINEAR || — || align=right | 4.9 km || 
|-id=067 bgcolor=#E9E9E9
| 151067 ||  || — || November 9, 2001 || Socorro || LINEAR || GEF || align=right | 2.3 km || 
|-id=068 bgcolor=#E9E9E9
| 151068 ||  || — || November 9, 2001 || Socorro || LINEAR || — || align=right | 2.2 km || 
|-id=069 bgcolor=#E9E9E9
| 151069 ||  || — || November 9, 2001 || Socorro || LINEAR || — || align=right | 3.2 km || 
|-id=070 bgcolor=#E9E9E9
| 151070 ||  || — || November 10, 2001 || Socorro || LINEAR || EUN || align=right | 2.1 km || 
|-id=071 bgcolor=#E9E9E9
| 151071 ||  || — || November 10, 2001 || Socorro || LINEAR || KON || align=right | 4.1 km || 
|-id=072 bgcolor=#E9E9E9
| 151072 ||  || — || November 10, 2001 || Socorro || LINEAR || ADE || align=right | 5.2 km || 
|-id=073 bgcolor=#fefefe
| 151073 ||  || — || November 10, 2001 || Socorro || LINEAR || — || align=right | 2.7 km || 
|-id=074 bgcolor=#E9E9E9
| 151074 ||  || — || November 10, 2001 || Socorro || LINEAR || — || align=right | 2.4 km || 
|-id=075 bgcolor=#fefefe
| 151075 ||  || — || November 10, 2001 || Socorro || LINEAR || SUL || align=right | 4.0 km || 
|-id=076 bgcolor=#E9E9E9
| 151076 ||  || — || November 10, 2001 || Socorro || LINEAR || — || align=right | 5.6 km || 
|-id=077 bgcolor=#E9E9E9
| 151077 ||  || — || November 10, 2001 || Socorro || LINEAR || — || align=right | 3.4 km || 
|-id=078 bgcolor=#E9E9E9
| 151078 ||  || — || November 10, 2001 || Socorro || LINEAR || — || align=right | 3.1 km || 
|-id=079 bgcolor=#d6d6d6
| 151079 ||  || — || November 10, 2001 || Socorro || LINEAR || — || align=right | 8.7 km || 
|-id=080 bgcolor=#E9E9E9
| 151080 ||  || — || November 10, 2001 || Socorro || LINEAR || — || align=right | 2.3 km || 
|-id=081 bgcolor=#E9E9E9
| 151081 ||  || — || November 11, 2001 || Socorro || LINEAR || — || align=right | 2.2 km || 
|-id=082 bgcolor=#E9E9E9
| 151082 ||  || — || November 12, 2001 || Socorro || LINEAR || GEF || align=right | 1.9 km || 
|-id=083 bgcolor=#E9E9E9
| 151083 ||  || — || November 9, 2001 || Palomar || NEAT || — || align=right | 3.0 km || 
|-id=084 bgcolor=#E9E9E9
| 151084 ||  || — || November 12, 2001 || Haleakala || NEAT || — || align=right | 2.9 km || 
|-id=085 bgcolor=#E9E9E9
| 151085 ||  || — || November 10, 2001 || Socorro || LINEAR || HOF || align=right | 4.5 km || 
|-id=086 bgcolor=#E9E9E9
| 151086 ||  || — || November 11, 2001 || Socorro || LINEAR || — || align=right | 2.4 km || 
|-id=087 bgcolor=#E9E9E9
| 151087 ||  || — || November 12, 2001 || Socorro || LINEAR || — || align=right | 2.4 km || 
|-id=088 bgcolor=#E9E9E9
| 151088 ||  || — || November 15, 2001 || Socorro || LINEAR || BRG || align=right | 2.6 km || 
|-id=089 bgcolor=#E9E9E9
| 151089 ||  || — || November 15, 2001 || Socorro || LINEAR || — || align=right | 3.7 km || 
|-id=090 bgcolor=#E9E9E9
| 151090 ||  || — || November 15, 2001 || Socorro || LINEAR || MIT || align=right | 5.0 km || 
|-id=091 bgcolor=#E9E9E9
| 151091 ||  || — || November 15, 2001 || Socorro || LINEAR || — || align=right | 3.6 km || 
|-id=092 bgcolor=#E9E9E9
| 151092 ||  || — || November 15, 2001 || Socorro || LINEAR || — || align=right | 4.5 km || 
|-id=093 bgcolor=#E9E9E9
| 151093 ||  || — || November 15, 2001 || Socorro || LINEAR || — || align=right | 3.2 km || 
|-id=094 bgcolor=#E9E9E9
| 151094 ||  || — || November 12, 2001 || Socorro || LINEAR || — || align=right | 2.6 km || 
|-id=095 bgcolor=#E9E9E9
| 151095 ||  || — || November 12, 2001 || Socorro || LINEAR || — || align=right | 2.3 km || 
|-id=096 bgcolor=#E9E9E9
| 151096 ||  || — || November 12, 2001 || Socorro || LINEAR || — || align=right | 1.7 km || 
|-id=097 bgcolor=#E9E9E9
| 151097 ||  || — || November 12, 2001 || Socorro || LINEAR || — || align=right | 2.0 km || 
|-id=098 bgcolor=#E9E9E9
| 151098 ||  || — || November 12, 2001 || Socorro || LINEAR || MIS || align=right | 3.8 km || 
|-id=099 bgcolor=#E9E9E9
| 151099 ||  || — || November 12, 2001 || Socorro || LINEAR || — || align=right | 1.9 km || 
|-id=100 bgcolor=#E9E9E9
| 151100 ||  || — || November 12, 2001 || Socorro || LINEAR || — || align=right | 2.0 km || 
|}

151101–151200 

|-bgcolor=#E9E9E9
| 151101 ||  || — || November 12, 2001 || Socorro || LINEAR || — || align=right | 2.3 km || 
|-id=102 bgcolor=#E9E9E9
| 151102 ||  || — || November 10, 2001 || Palomar || NEAT || — || align=right | 2.7 km || 
|-id=103 bgcolor=#d6d6d6
| 151103 ||  || — || November 13, 2001 || Haleakala || NEAT || EOS || align=right | 3.5 km || 
|-id=104 bgcolor=#E9E9E9
| 151104 ||  || — || November 17, 2001 || Socorro || LINEAR || BRG || align=right | 2.8 km || 
|-id=105 bgcolor=#E9E9E9
| 151105 ||  || — || November 17, 2001 || Socorro || LINEAR || MAR || align=right | 2.3 km || 
|-id=106 bgcolor=#E9E9E9
| 151106 ||  || — || November 17, 2001 || Socorro || LINEAR || — || align=right | 4.0 km || 
|-id=107 bgcolor=#E9E9E9
| 151107 ||  || — || November 17, 2001 || Kitt Peak || Spacewatch || — || align=right | 2.4 km || 
|-id=108 bgcolor=#E9E9E9
| 151108 ||  || — || November 17, 2001 || Socorro || LINEAR || — || align=right | 4.5 km || 
|-id=109 bgcolor=#E9E9E9
| 151109 ||  || — || November 27, 2001 || Socorro || LINEAR || BRU || align=right | 5.2 km || 
|-id=110 bgcolor=#E9E9E9
| 151110 ||  || — || November 17, 2001 || Socorro || LINEAR || NEM || align=right | 5.0 km || 
|-id=111 bgcolor=#E9E9E9
| 151111 ||  || — || November 17, 2001 || Socorro || LINEAR || — || align=right | 2.2 km || 
|-id=112 bgcolor=#E9E9E9
| 151112 ||  || — || November 17, 2001 || Socorro || LINEAR || — || align=right | 2.4 km || 
|-id=113 bgcolor=#E9E9E9
| 151113 ||  || — || November 17, 2001 || Socorro || LINEAR || — || align=right | 1.4 km || 
|-id=114 bgcolor=#E9E9E9
| 151114 ||  || — || November 17, 2001 || Socorro || LINEAR || — || align=right | 2.5 km || 
|-id=115 bgcolor=#fefefe
| 151115 ||  || — || November 17, 2001 || Socorro || LINEAR || NYS || align=right | 1.4 km || 
|-id=116 bgcolor=#E9E9E9
| 151116 ||  || — || November 17, 2001 || Socorro || LINEAR || HEN || align=right | 1.5 km || 
|-id=117 bgcolor=#E9E9E9
| 151117 ||  || — || November 17, 2001 || Socorro || LINEAR || — || align=right | 2.1 km || 
|-id=118 bgcolor=#E9E9E9
| 151118 ||  || — || November 19, 2001 || Anderson Mesa || LONEOS || — || align=right | 3.1 km || 
|-id=119 bgcolor=#E9E9E9
| 151119 ||  || — || November 19, 2001 || Socorro || LINEAR || HOF || align=right | 3.5 km || 
|-id=120 bgcolor=#E9E9E9
| 151120 ||  || — || November 19, 2001 || Socorro || LINEAR || — || align=right | 3.4 km || 
|-id=121 bgcolor=#E9E9E9
| 151121 ||  || — || November 19, 2001 || Socorro || LINEAR || — || align=right | 1.9 km || 
|-id=122 bgcolor=#E9E9E9
| 151122 ||  || — || November 19, 2001 || Socorro || LINEAR || — || align=right | 1.8 km || 
|-id=123 bgcolor=#E9E9E9
| 151123 ||  || — || November 19, 2001 || Socorro || LINEAR || HEN || align=right | 1.5 km || 
|-id=124 bgcolor=#E9E9E9
| 151124 ||  || — || November 20, 2001 || Socorro || LINEAR || — || align=right | 2.3 km || 
|-id=125 bgcolor=#E9E9E9
| 151125 ||  || — || November 17, 2001 || Kitt Peak || Spacewatch || — || align=right | 2.5 km || 
|-id=126 bgcolor=#E9E9E9
| 151126 ||  || — || December 8, 2001 || Socorro || LINEAR || HNS || align=right | 2.0 km || 
|-id=127 bgcolor=#E9E9E9
| 151127 ||  || — || December 8, 2001 || Socorro || LINEAR || HNS || align=right | 2.5 km || 
|-id=128 bgcolor=#E9E9E9
| 151128 ||  || — || December 5, 2001 || Haleakala || NEAT || — || align=right | 2.5 km || 
|-id=129 bgcolor=#E9E9E9
| 151129 ||  || — || December 8, 2001 || Socorro || LINEAR || EUN || align=right | 3.0 km || 
|-id=130 bgcolor=#E9E9E9
| 151130 ||  || — || December 9, 2001 || Socorro || LINEAR || — || align=right | 3.6 km || 
|-id=131 bgcolor=#E9E9E9
| 151131 ||  || — || December 9, 2001 || Socorro || LINEAR || CLO || align=right | 4.0 km || 
|-id=132 bgcolor=#E9E9E9
| 151132 ||  || — || December 9, 2001 || Socorro || LINEAR || — || align=right | 2.7 km || 
|-id=133 bgcolor=#E9E9E9
| 151133 ||  || — || December 9, 2001 || Socorro || LINEAR || — || align=right | 3.9 km || 
|-id=134 bgcolor=#E9E9E9
| 151134 ||  || — || December 9, 2001 || Socorro || LINEAR || GEF || align=right | 2.2 km || 
|-id=135 bgcolor=#E9E9E9
| 151135 ||  || — || December 10, 2001 || Kitt Peak || Spacewatch || — || align=right | 4.1 km || 
|-id=136 bgcolor=#E9E9E9
| 151136 ||  || — || December 9, 2001 || Socorro || LINEAR || EUN || align=right | 2.8 km || 
|-id=137 bgcolor=#E9E9E9
| 151137 ||  || — || December 9, 2001 || Socorro || LINEAR || JUN || align=right | 4.8 km || 
|-id=138 bgcolor=#E9E9E9
| 151138 ||  || — || December 9, 2001 || Socorro || LINEAR || — || align=right | 2.7 km || 
|-id=139 bgcolor=#E9E9E9
| 151139 ||  || — || December 9, 2001 || Socorro || LINEAR || — || align=right | 5.1 km || 
|-id=140 bgcolor=#E9E9E9
| 151140 ||  || — || December 9, 2001 || Socorro || LINEAR || — || align=right | 3.6 km || 
|-id=141 bgcolor=#E9E9E9
| 151141 ||  || — || December 9, 2001 || Socorro || LINEAR || — || align=right | 4.0 km || 
|-id=142 bgcolor=#d6d6d6
| 151142 ||  || — || December 9, 2001 || Socorro || LINEAR || — || align=right | 6.1 km || 
|-id=143 bgcolor=#E9E9E9
| 151143 ||  || — || December 9, 2001 || Socorro || LINEAR || — || align=right | 6.3 km || 
|-id=144 bgcolor=#E9E9E9
| 151144 ||  || — || December 10, 2001 || Socorro || LINEAR || ADE || align=right | 4.2 km || 
|-id=145 bgcolor=#E9E9E9
| 151145 ||  || — || December 10, 2001 || Socorro || LINEAR || — || align=right | 2.3 km || 
|-id=146 bgcolor=#E9E9E9
| 151146 ||  || — || December 10, 2001 || Socorro || LINEAR || — || align=right | 3.2 km || 
|-id=147 bgcolor=#E9E9E9
| 151147 ||  || — || December 10, 2001 || Socorro || LINEAR || — || align=right | 2.2 km || 
|-id=148 bgcolor=#E9E9E9
| 151148 ||  || — || December 10, 2001 || Socorro || LINEAR || DOR || align=right | 3.3 km || 
|-id=149 bgcolor=#E9E9E9
| 151149 ||  || — || December 10, 2001 || Socorro || LINEAR || — || align=right | 2.7 km || 
|-id=150 bgcolor=#E9E9E9
| 151150 ||  || — || December 10, 2001 || Socorro || LINEAR || — || align=right | 2.3 km || 
|-id=151 bgcolor=#E9E9E9
| 151151 ||  || — || December 11, 2001 || Socorro || LINEAR || — || align=right | 4.0 km || 
|-id=152 bgcolor=#E9E9E9
| 151152 ||  || — || December 11, 2001 || Socorro || LINEAR || — || align=right | 2.6 km || 
|-id=153 bgcolor=#E9E9E9
| 151153 ||  || — || December 11, 2001 || Socorro || LINEAR || — || align=right | 2.0 km || 
|-id=154 bgcolor=#E9E9E9
| 151154 ||  || — || December 10, 2001 || Socorro || LINEAR || — || align=right | 3.1 km || 
|-id=155 bgcolor=#E9E9E9
| 151155 ||  || — || December 10, 2001 || Socorro || LINEAR || — || align=right | 2.1 km || 
|-id=156 bgcolor=#E9E9E9
| 151156 ||  || — || December 11, 2001 || Socorro || LINEAR || MRX || align=right | 1.8 km || 
|-id=157 bgcolor=#E9E9E9
| 151157 ||  || — || December 14, 2001 || Kitt Peak || Spacewatch || — || align=right | 3.1 km || 
|-id=158 bgcolor=#E9E9E9
| 151158 ||  || — || December 11, 2001 || Socorro || LINEAR || — || align=right | 2.5 km || 
|-id=159 bgcolor=#E9E9E9
| 151159 ||  || — || December 14, 2001 || Socorro || LINEAR || HEN || align=right | 1.4 km || 
|-id=160 bgcolor=#E9E9E9
| 151160 ||  || — || December 14, 2001 || Socorro || LINEAR || — || align=right | 2.2 km || 
|-id=161 bgcolor=#E9E9E9
| 151161 ||  || — || December 14, 2001 || Socorro || LINEAR || — || align=right | 2.1 km || 
|-id=162 bgcolor=#E9E9E9
| 151162 ||  || — || December 14, 2001 || Socorro || LINEAR || — || align=right | 1.6 km || 
|-id=163 bgcolor=#E9E9E9
| 151163 ||  || — || December 14, 2001 || Socorro || LINEAR || — || align=right | 1.6 km || 
|-id=164 bgcolor=#E9E9E9
| 151164 ||  || — || December 14, 2001 || Socorro || LINEAR || — || align=right | 2.5 km || 
|-id=165 bgcolor=#E9E9E9
| 151165 ||  || — || December 14, 2001 || Socorro || LINEAR || — || align=right | 2.3 km || 
|-id=166 bgcolor=#d6d6d6
| 151166 ||  || — || December 14, 2001 || Socorro || LINEAR || — || align=right | 3.9 km || 
|-id=167 bgcolor=#d6d6d6
| 151167 ||  || — || December 14, 2001 || Socorro || LINEAR || KOR || align=right | 2.6 km || 
|-id=168 bgcolor=#E9E9E9
| 151168 ||  || — || December 14, 2001 || Socorro || LINEAR || HEN || align=right | 1.9 km || 
|-id=169 bgcolor=#E9E9E9
| 151169 ||  || — || December 14, 2001 || Socorro || LINEAR || EUN || align=right | 2.1 km || 
|-id=170 bgcolor=#E9E9E9
| 151170 ||  || — || December 14, 2001 || Socorro || LINEAR || — || align=right | 3.4 km || 
|-id=171 bgcolor=#E9E9E9
| 151171 ||  || — || December 14, 2001 || Socorro || LINEAR || — || align=right | 2.1 km || 
|-id=172 bgcolor=#E9E9E9
| 151172 ||  || — || December 14, 2001 || Socorro || LINEAR || — || align=right | 2.6 km || 
|-id=173 bgcolor=#E9E9E9
| 151173 ||  || — || December 14, 2001 || Socorro || LINEAR || — || align=right | 3.2 km || 
|-id=174 bgcolor=#E9E9E9
| 151174 ||  || — || December 14, 2001 || Socorro || LINEAR || — || align=right | 2.6 km || 
|-id=175 bgcolor=#E9E9E9
| 151175 ||  || — || December 14, 2001 || Socorro || LINEAR || — || align=right | 2.2 km || 
|-id=176 bgcolor=#E9E9E9
| 151176 ||  || — || December 14, 2001 || Socorro || LINEAR || — || align=right | 3.1 km || 
|-id=177 bgcolor=#E9E9E9
| 151177 ||  || — || December 14, 2001 || Socorro || LINEAR || — || align=right | 5.0 km || 
|-id=178 bgcolor=#E9E9E9
| 151178 ||  || — || December 15, 2001 || Socorro || LINEAR || — || align=right | 1.8 km || 
|-id=179 bgcolor=#E9E9E9
| 151179 ||  || — || December 11, 2001 || Socorro || LINEAR || HNA || align=right | 2.7 km || 
|-id=180 bgcolor=#E9E9E9
| 151180 ||  || — || December 11, 2001 || Socorro || LINEAR || — || align=right | 2.4 km || 
|-id=181 bgcolor=#E9E9E9
| 151181 ||  || — || December 11, 2001 || Socorro || LINEAR || — || align=right | 3.3 km || 
|-id=182 bgcolor=#E9E9E9
| 151182 ||  || — || December 11, 2001 || Socorro || LINEAR || — || align=right | 4.1 km || 
|-id=183 bgcolor=#E9E9E9
| 151183 ||  || — || December 11, 2001 || Socorro || LINEAR || — || align=right | 4.0 km || 
|-id=184 bgcolor=#E9E9E9
| 151184 ||  || — || December 11, 2001 || Socorro || LINEAR || — || align=right | 2.8 km || 
|-id=185 bgcolor=#fefefe
| 151185 ||  || — || December 11, 2001 || Socorro || LINEAR || H || align=right | 1.0 km || 
|-id=186 bgcolor=#d6d6d6
| 151186 ||  || — || December 14, 2001 || Socorro || LINEAR || — || align=right | 5.2 km || 
|-id=187 bgcolor=#E9E9E9
| 151187 ||  || — || December 14, 2001 || Socorro || LINEAR || — || align=right | 3.5 km || 
|-id=188 bgcolor=#d6d6d6
| 151188 ||  || — || December 14, 2001 || Socorro || LINEAR || — || align=right | 6.5 km || 
|-id=189 bgcolor=#E9E9E9
| 151189 ||  || — || December 15, 2001 || Socorro || LINEAR || — || align=right | 2.7 km || 
|-id=190 bgcolor=#E9E9E9
| 151190 ||  || — || December 15, 2001 || Socorro || LINEAR || — || align=right | 2.6 km || 
|-id=191 bgcolor=#E9E9E9
| 151191 ||  || — || December 15, 2001 || Socorro || LINEAR || — || align=right | 1.7 km || 
|-id=192 bgcolor=#E9E9E9
| 151192 ||  || — || December 15, 2001 || Socorro || LINEAR || HEN || align=right | 1.4 km || 
|-id=193 bgcolor=#E9E9E9
| 151193 ||  || — || December 15, 2001 || Socorro || LINEAR || — || align=right | 3.7 km || 
|-id=194 bgcolor=#E9E9E9
| 151194 ||  || — || December 15, 2001 || Socorro || LINEAR || PAD || align=right | 2.9 km || 
|-id=195 bgcolor=#E9E9E9
| 151195 ||  || — || December 15, 2001 || Socorro || LINEAR || — || align=right | 2.3 km || 
|-id=196 bgcolor=#E9E9E9
| 151196 ||  || — || December 14, 2001 || Kitt Peak || Spacewatch || — || align=right | 1.6 km || 
|-id=197 bgcolor=#E9E9E9
| 151197 || 2001 YS || — || December 18, 2001 || Kingsnake || J. V. McClusky || — || align=right | 2.9 km || 
|-id=198 bgcolor=#E9E9E9
| 151198 ||  || — || December 17, 2001 || Socorro || LINEAR || — || align=right | 2.7 km || 
|-id=199 bgcolor=#E9E9E9
| 151199 ||  || — || December 17, 2001 || Socorro || LINEAR || — || align=right | 2.0 km || 
|-id=200 bgcolor=#E9E9E9
| 151200 ||  || — || December 17, 2001 || Socorro || LINEAR || MIS || align=right | 4.6 km || 
|}

151201–151300 

|-bgcolor=#d6d6d6
| 151201 ||  || — || December 17, 2001 || Socorro || LINEAR || — || align=right | 4.3 km || 
|-id=202 bgcolor=#E9E9E9
| 151202 ||  || — || December 18, 2001 || Socorro || LINEAR || — || align=right | 1.7 km || 
|-id=203 bgcolor=#E9E9E9
| 151203 ||  || — || December 18, 2001 || Socorro || LINEAR || — || align=right | 3.3 km || 
|-id=204 bgcolor=#E9E9E9
| 151204 ||  || — || December 18, 2001 || Socorro || LINEAR || — || align=right | 2.7 km || 
|-id=205 bgcolor=#E9E9E9
| 151205 ||  || — || December 18, 2001 || Socorro || LINEAR || — || align=right | 2.8 km || 
|-id=206 bgcolor=#E9E9E9
| 151206 ||  || — || December 18, 2001 || Socorro || LINEAR || — || align=right | 2.3 km || 
|-id=207 bgcolor=#E9E9E9
| 151207 ||  || — || December 18, 2001 || Socorro || LINEAR || MRX || align=right | 1.4 km || 
|-id=208 bgcolor=#E9E9E9
| 151208 ||  || — || December 18, 2001 || Socorro || LINEAR || — || align=right | 3.2 km || 
|-id=209 bgcolor=#E9E9E9
| 151209 ||  || — || December 18, 2001 || Socorro || LINEAR || — || align=right | 4.0 km || 
|-id=210 bgcolor=#E9E9E9
| 151210 ||  || — || December 18, 2001 || Socorro || LINEAR || XIZ || align=right | 2.2 km || 
|-id=211 bgcolor=#E9E9E9
| 151211 ||  || — || December 18, 2001 || Socorro || LINEAR || — || align=right | 4.7 km || 
|-id=212 bgcolor=#E9E9E9
| 151212 ||  || — || December 18, 2001 || Socorro || LINEAR || MIS || align=right | 3.4 km || 
|-id=213 bgcolor=#E9E9E9
| 151213 ||  || — || December 18, 2001 || Socorro || LINEAR || EUN || align=right | 2.1 km || 
|-id=214 bgcolor=#E9E9E9
| 151214 ||  || — || December 18, 2001 || Socorro || LINEAR || — || align=right | 2.9 km || 
|-id=215 bgcolor=#E9E9E9
| 151215 ||  || — || December 18, 2001 || Socorro || LINEAR || — || align=right | 2.2 km || 
|-id=216 bgcolor=#E9E9E9
| 151216 ||  || — || December 18, 2001 || Socorro || LINEAR || AGN || align=right | 2.1 km || 
|-id=217 bgcolor=#E9E9E9
| 151217 ||  || — || December 18, 2001 || Socorro || LINEAR || — || align=right | 3.8 km || 
|-id=218 bgcolor=#E9E9E9
| 151218 ||  || — || December 18, 2001 || Socorro || LINEAR || WIT || align=right | 1.8 km || 
|-id=219 bgcolor=#E9E9E9
| 151219 ||  || — || December 18, 2001 || Socorro || LINEAR || — || align=right | 4.0 km || 
|-id=220 bgcolor=#E9E9E9
| 151220 ||  || — || December 18, 2001 || Socorro || LINEAR || — || align=right | 3.1 km || 
|-id=221 bgcolor=#E9E9E9
| 151221 ||  || — || December 18, 2001 || Socorro || LINEAR || — || align=right | 4.0 km || 
|-id=222 bgcolor=#d6d6d6
| 151222 ||  || — || December 17, 2001 || Palomar || NEAT || — || align=right | 4.0 km || 
|-id=223 bgcolor=#E9E9E9
| 151223 ||  || — || December 18, 2001 || Palomar || NEAT || NEM || align=right | 4.0 km || 
|-id=224 bgcolor=#E9E9E9
| 151224 ||  || — || December 18, 2001 || Palomar || NEAT || — || align=right | 5.1 km || 
|-id=225 bgcolor=#d6d6d6
| 151225 ||  || — || December 17, 2001 || Socorro || LINEAR || — || align=right | 3.0 km || 
|-id=226 bgcolor=#E9E9E9
| 151226 ||  || — || December 17, 2001 || Socorro || LINEAR || — || align=right | 3.1 km || 
|-id=227 bgcolor=#E9E9E9
| 151227 ||  || — || December 17, 2001 || Socorro || LINEAR || XIZ || align=right | 2.2 km || 
|-id=228 bgcolor=#E9E9E9
| 151228 ||  || — || December 17, 2001 || Socorro || LINEAR || — || align=right | 4.1 km || 
|-id=229 bgcolor=#E9E9E9
| 151229 ||  || — || December 18, 2001 || Socorro || LINEAR || — || align=right | 2.9 km || 
|-id=230 bgcolor=#d6d6d6
| 151230 ||  || — || December 18, 2001 || Palomar || NEAT || CHA || align=right | 3.4 km || 
|-id=231 bgcolor=#E9E9E9
| 151231 ||  || — || December 19, 2001 || Palomar || NEAT || — || align=right | 5.9 km || 
|-id=232 bgcolor=#E9E9E9
| 151232 ||  || — || December 18, 2001 || Socorro || LINEAR || — || align=right | 1.7 km || 
|-id=233 bgcolor=#E9E9E9
| 151233 ||  || — || December 17, 2001 || Socorro || LINEAR || — || align=right | 4.1 km || 
|-id=234 bgcolor=#E9E9E9
| 151234 ||  || — || December 17, 2001 || Socorro || LINEAR || — || align=right | 4.2 km || 
|-id=235 bgcolor=#E9E9E9
| 151235 ||  || — || December 17, 2001 || Socorro || LINEAR || NEM || align=right | 4.7 km || 
|-id=236 bgcolor=#E9E9E9
| 151236 ||  || — || December 17, 2001 || Socorro || LINEAR || — || align=right | 4.1 km || 
|-id=237 bgcolor=#E9E9E9
| 151237 ||  || — || December 17, 2001 || Socorro || LINEAR || — || align=right | 3.8 km || 
|-id=238 bgcolor=#E9E9E9
| 151238 ||  || — || December 19, 2001 || Anderson Mesa || LONEOS || INO || align=right | 1.9 km || 
|-id=239 bgcolor=#E9E9E9
| 151239 ||  || — || December 20, 2001 || Palomar || NEAT || — || align=right | 3.9 km || 
|-id=240 bgcolor=#E9E9E9
| 151240 ||  || — || December 19, 2001 || Anderson Mesa || LONEOS || — || align=right | 4.0 km || 
|-id=241 bgcolor=#E9E9E9
| 151241 || 2002 AE || — || January 4, 2002 || Kleť || Kleť Obs. || AGN || align=right | 2.0 km || 
|-id=242 bgcolor=#E9E9E9
| 151242 Hajós ||  ||  || January 11, 2002 || Piszkéstető || K. Sárneczky, Z. Heiner || DOR || align=right | 3.5 km || 
|-id=243 bgcolor=#E9E9E9
| 151243 ||  || — || January 5, 2002 || Haleakala || NEAT || AGN || align=right | 2.3 km || 
|-id=244 bgcolor=#d6d6d6
| 151244 ||  || — || January 6, 2002 || Palomar || NEAT || CHA || align=right | 3.5 km || 
|-id=245 bgcolor=#E9E9E9
| 151245 ||  || — || January 8, 2002 || Palomar || NEAT || — || align=right | 4.0 km || 
|-id=246 bgcolor=#E9E9E9
| 151246 ||  || — || January 8, 2002 || Palomar || NEAT || EUN || align=right | 2.4 km || 
|-id=247 bgcolor=#d6d6d6
| 151247 ||  || — || January 8, 2002 || Palomar || NEAT || — || align=right | 5.7 km || 
|-id=248 bgcolor=#d6d6d6
| 151248 ||  || — || January 8, 2002 || Kitt Peak || Spacewatch || — || align=right | 4.7 km || 
|-id=249 bgcolor=#E9E9E9
| 151249 ||  || — || January 9, 2002 || Socorro || LINEAR || XIZ || align=right | 2.0 km || 
|-id=250 bgcolor=#E9E9E9
| 151250 ||  || — || January 9, 2002 || Socorro || LINEAR || 526 || align=right | 4.8 km || 
|-id=251 bgcolor=#E9E9E9
| 151251 ||  || — || January 9, 2002 || Socorro || LINEAR || AEO || align=right | 1.7 km || 
|-id=252 bgcolor=#d6d6d6
| 151252 ||  || — || January 9, 2002 || Socorro || LINEAR || — || align=right | 5.0 km || 
|-id=253 bgcolor=#E9E9E9
| 151253 ||  || — || January 9, 2002 || Socorro || LINEAR || — || align=right | 3.5 km || 
|-id=254 bgcolor=#E9E9E9
| 151254 ||  || — || January 9, 2002 || Socorro || LINEAR || HOF || align=right | 4.1 km || 
|-id=255 bgcolor=#d6d6d6
| 151255 ||  || — || January 9, 2002 || Socorro || LINEAR || — || align=right | 3.7 km || 
|-id=256 bgcolor=#E9E9E9
| 151256 ||  || — || January 9, 2002 || Socorro || LINEAR || WAT || align=right | 4.6 km || 
|-id=257 bgcolor=#E9E9E9
| 151257 ||  || — || January 9, 2002 || Socorro || LINEAR || — || align=right | 5.9 km || 
|-id=258 bgcolor=#E9E9E9
| 151258 ||  || — || January 12, 2002 || Socorro || LINEAR || — || align=right | 3.4 km || 
|-id=259 bgcolor=#E9E9E9
| 151259 ||  || — || January 8, 2002 || Socorro || LINEAR || — || align=right | 3.6 km || 
|-id=260 bgcolor=#d6d6d6
| 151260 ||  || — || January 8, 2002 || Socorro || LINEAR || — || align=right | 4.1 km || 
|-id=261 bgcolor=#E9E9E9
| 151261 ||  || — || January 9, 2002 || Socorro || LINEAR || — || align=right | 3.7 km || 
|-id=262 bgcolor=#E9E9E9
| 151262 ||  || — || January 9, 2002 || Socorro || LINEAR || — || align=right | 4.0 km || 
|-id=263 bgcolor=#E9E9E9
| 151263 ||  || — || January 8, 2002 || Socorro || LINEAR || — || align=right | 3.7 km || 
|-id=264 bgcolor=#E9E9E9
| 151264 ||  || — || January 8, 2002 || Socorro || LINEAR || HEN || align=right | 1.8 km || 
|-id=265 bgcolor=#d6d6d6
| 151265 ||  || — || January 9, 2002 || Socorro || LINEAR || — || align=right | 4.4 km || 
|-id=266 bgcolor=#d6d6d6
| 151266 ||  || — || January 9, 2002 || Socorro || LINEAR || — || align=right | 3.7 km || 
|-id=267 bgcolor=#d6d6d6
| 151267 ||  || — || January 11, 2002 || Socorro || LINEAR || EUP || align=right | 8.3 km || 
|-id=268 bgcolor=#E9E9E9
| 151268 ||  || — || January 8, 2002 || Socorro || LINEAR || AEO || align=right | 2.0 km || 
|-id=269 bgcolor=#E9E9E9
| 151269 ||  || — || January 9, 2002 || Socorro || LINEAR || — || align=right | 3.7 km || 
|-id=270 bgcolor=#E9E9E9
| 151270 ||  || — || January 13, 2002 || Socorro || LINEAR || — || align=right | 3.5 km || 
|-id=271 bgcolor=#E9E9E9
| 151271 ||  || — || January 13, 2002 || Socorro || LINEAR || — || align=right | 3.3 km || 
|-id=272 bgcolor=#E9E9E9
| 151272 ||  || — || January 14, 2002 || Socorro || LINEAR || — || align=right | 3.2 km || 
|-id=273 bgcolor=#E9E9E9
| 151273 ||  || — || January 14, 2002 || Socorro || LINEAR || DOR || align=right | 5.3 km || 
|-id=274 bgcolor=#d6d6d6
| 151274 ||  || — || January 13, 2002 || Socorro || LINEAR || — || align=right | 3.5 km || 
|-id=275 bgcolor=#E9E9E9
| 151275 ||  || — || January 5, 2002 || Palomar || NEAT || — || align=right | 3.4 km || 
|-id=276 bgcolor=#E9E9E9
| 151276 ||  || — || January 5, 2002 || Palomar || NEAT || — || align=right | 6.6 km || 
|-id=277 bgcolor=#E9E9E9
| 151277 ||  || — || January 5, 2002 || Palomar || NEAT || — || align=right | 4.1 km || 
|-id=278 bgcolor=#E9E9E9
| 151278 ||  || — || January 6, 2002 || Anderson Mesa || LONEOS || — || align=right | 2.4 km || 
|-id=279 bgcolor=#E9E9E9
| 151279 ||  || — || January 8, 2002 || Palomar || NEAT || — || align=right | 3.0 km || 
|-id=280 bgcolor=#E9E9E9
| 151280 ||  || — || January 10, 2002 || Campo Imperatore || CINEOS || — || align=right | 3.0 km || 
|-id=281 bgcolor=#E9E9E9
| 151281 ||  || — || January 12, 2002 || Kitt Peak || Spacewatch || HEN || align=right | 2.0 km || 
|-id=282 bgcolor=#d6d6d6
| 151282 ||  || — || January 13, 2002 || Kitt Peak || Spacewatch || KOR || align=right | 2.0 km || 
|-id=283 bgcolor=#E9E9E9
| 151283 ||  || — || January 13, 2002 || Socorro || LINEAR || AGN || align=right | 2.0 km || 
|-id=284 bgcolor=#d6d6d6
| 151284 ||  || — || January 7, 2002 || Kitt Peak || Spacewatch || — || align=right | 4.0 km || 
|-id=285 bgcolor=#d6d6d6
| 151285 ||  || — || January 5, 2002 || Kitt Peak || Spacewatch || — || align=right | 4.2 km || 
|-id=286 bgcolor=#d6d6d6
| 151286 ||  || — || January 19, 2002 || Socorro || LINEAR || — || align=right | 4.9 km || 
|-id=287 bgcolor=#E9E9E9
| 151287 ||  || — || January 23, 2002 || Socorro || LINEAR || — || align=right | 4.2 km || 
|-id=288 bgcolor=#E9E9E9
| 151288 ||  || — || January 23, 2002 || Socorro || LINEAR || — || align=right | 4.5 km || 
|-id=289 bgcolor=#d6d6d6
| 151289 ||  || — || January 18, 2002 || Palomar || NEAT || — || align=right | 3.5 km || 
|-id=290 bgcolor=#E9E9E9
| 151290 ||  || — || February 6, 2002 || Desert Eagle || W. K. Y. Yeung || — || align=right | 3.2 km || 
|-id=291 bgcolor=#fefefe
| 151291 ||  || — || February 6, 2002 || Socorro || LINEAR || H || align=right data-sort-value="0.84" | 840 m || 
|-id=292 bgcolor=#E9E9E9
| 151292 ||  || — || February 8, 2002 || Fountain Hills || C. W. Juels, P. R. Holvorcem || — || align=right | 3.1 km || 
|-id=293 bgcolor=#E9E9E9
| 151293 ||  || — || February 6, 2002 || Socorro || LINEAR || — || align=right | 4.0 km || 
|-id=294 bgcolor=#E9E9E9
| 151294 ||  || — || February 6, 2002 || Socorro || LINEAR || GEF || align=right | 2.3 km || 
|-id=295 bgcolor=#d6d6d6
| 151295 ||  || — || February 6, 2002 || Socorro || LINEAR || — || align=right | 6.5 km || 
|-id=296 bgcolor=#d6d6d6
| 151296 ||  || — || February 12, 2002 || Cordell-Lorenz || D. T. Durig || — || align=right | 7.1 km || 
|-id=297 bgcolor=#d6d6d6
| 151297 ||  || — || February 12, 2002 || Desert Eagle || W. K. Y. Yeung || — || align=right | 5.3 km || 
|-id=298 bgcolor=#E9E9E9
| 151298 ||  || — || February 7, 2002 || Socorro || LINEAR || HOF || align=right | 4.6 km || 
|-id=299 bgcolor=#E9E9E9
| 151299 ||  || — || February 7, 2002 || Socorro || LINEAR || HOF || align=right | 4.8 km || 
|-id=300 bgcolor=#d6d6d6
| 151300 ||  || — || February 7, 2002 || Socorro || LINEAR || KAR || align=right | 2.2 km || 
|}

151301–151400 

|-bgcolor=#d6d6d6
| 151301 ||  || — || February 7, 2002 || Socorro || LINEAR || — || align=right | 6.9 km || 
|-id=302 bgcolor=#d6d6d6
| 151302 ||  || — || February 7, 2002 || Socorro || LINEAR || EOS || align=right | 3.5 km || 
|-id=303 bgcolor=#d6d6d6
| 151303 ||  || — || February 7, 2002 || Socorro || LINEAR || — || align=right | 3.9 km || 
|-id=304 bgcolor=#d6d6d6
| 151304 ||  || — || February 7, 2002 || Socorro || LINEAR || FIR || align=right | 5.3 km || 
|-id=305 bgcolor=#d6d6d6
| 151305 ||  || — || February 7, 2002 || Socorro || LINEAR || KOR || align=right | 2.3 km || 
|-id=306 bgcolor=#d6d6d6
| 151306 ||  || — || February 7, 2002 || Socorro || LINEAR || — || align=right | 3.1 km || 
|-id=307 bgcolor=#E9E9E9
| 151307 ||  || — || February 7, 2002 || Socorro || LINEAR || — || align=right | 4.7 km || 
|-id=308 bgcolor=#E9E9E9
| 151308 ||  || — || February 7, 2002 || Socorro || LINEAR || — || align=right | 3.8 km || 
|-id=309 bgcolor=#d6d6d6
| 151309 ||  || — || February 7, 2002 || Socorro || LINEAR || EOS || align=right | 3.0 km || 
|-id=310 bgcolor=#d6d6d6
| 151310 ||  || — || February 7, 2002 || Socorro || LINEAR || — || align=right | 4.2 km || 
|-id=311 bgcolor=#d6d6d6
| 151311 ||  || — || February 7, 2002 || Socorro || LINEAR || EOS || align=right | 3.0 km || 
|-id=312 bgcolor=#d6d6d6
| 151312 ||  || — || February 7, 2002 || Socorro || LINEAR || — || align=right | 4.9 km || 
|-id=313 bgcolor=#d6d6d6
| 151313 ||  || — || February 7, 2002 || Socorro || LINEAR || URS || align=right | 4.6 km || 
|-id=314 bgcolor=#d6d6d6
| 151314 ||  || — || February 7, 2002 || Socorro || LINEAR || — || align=right | 5.6 km || 
|-id=315 bgcolor=#d6d6d6
| 151315 ||  || — || February 8, 2002 || Needville || Needville Obs. || — || align=right | 4.7 km || 
|-id=316 bgcolor=#d6d6d6
| 151316 ||  || — || February 14, 2002 || Desert Eagle || W. K. Y. Yeung || EOS || align=right | 3.5 km || 
|-id=317 bgcolor=#d6d6d6
| 151317 ||  || — || February 7, 2002 || Socorro || LINEAR || KOR || align=right | 2.3 km || 
|-id=318 bgcolor=#d6d6d6
| 151318 ||  || — || February 7, 2002 || Socorro || LINEAR || — || align=right | 4.4 km || 
|-id=319 bgcolor=#d6d6d6
| 151319 ||  || — || February 7, 2002 || Socorro || LINEAR || — || align=right | 3.4 km || 
|-id=320 bgcolor=#E9E9E9
| 151320 ||  || — || February 7, 2002 || Socorro || LINEAR || WIT || align=right | 1.8 km || 
|-id=321 bgcolor=#d6d6d6
| 151321 ||  || — || February 7, 2002 || Socorro || LINEAR || — || align=right | 5.1 km || 
|-id=322 bgcolor=#d6d6d6
| 151322 ||  || — || February 8, 2002 || Socorro || LINEAR || FIR || align=right | 5.4 km || 
|-id=323 bgcolor=#E9E9E9
| 151323 ||  || — || February 8, 2002 || Socorro || LINEAR || — || align=right | 4.0 km || 
|-id=324 bgcolor=#d6d6d6
| 151324 ||  || — || February 9, 2002 || Socorro || LINEAR || — || align=right | 5.7 km || 
|-id=325 bgcolor=#E9E9E9
| 151325 ||  || — || February 10, 2002 || Socorro || LINEAR || AST || align=right | 2.8 km || 
|-id=326 bgcolor=#d6d6d6
| 151326 ||  || — || February 10, 2002 || Socorro || LINEAR || EOS || align=right | 2.7 km || 
|-id=327 bgcolor=#E9E9E9
| 151327 ||  || — || February 10, 2002 || Socorro || LINEAR || ADE || align=right | 5.3 km || 
|-id=328 bgcolor=#d6d6d6
| 151328 ||  || — || February 8, 2002 || Socorro || LINEAR || — || align=right | 4.6 km || 
|-id=329 bgcolor=#d6d6d6
| 151329 ||  || — || February 10, 2002 || Socorro || LINEAR || HYG || align=right | 4.4 km || 
|-id=330 bgcolor=#d6d6d6
| 151330 ||  || — || February 10, 2002 || Socorro || LINEAR || — || align=right | 3.9 km || 
|-id=331 bgcolor=#d6d6d6
| 151331 ||  || — || February 10, 2002 || Socorro || LINEAR || KOR || align=right | 2.2 km || 
|-id=332 bgcolor=#d6d6d6
| 151332 ||  || — || February 10, 2002 || Socorro || LINEAR || KOR || align=right | 2.2 km || 
|-id=333 bgcolor=#d6d6d6
| 151333 ||  || — || February 10, 2002 || Socorro || LINEAR || — || align=right | 4.1 km || 
|-id=334 bgcolor=#d6d6d6
| 151334 ||  || — || February 10, 2002 || Socorro || LINEAR || — || align=right | 3.8 km || 
|-id=335 bgcolor=#d6d6d6
| 151335 ||  || — || February 10, 2002 || Socorro || LINEAR || KOR || align=right | 2.8 km || 
|-id=336 bgcolor=#d6d6d6
| 151336 ||  || — || February 10, 2002 || Socorro || LINEAR || — || align=right | 3.9 km || 
|-id=337 bgcolor=#d6d6d6
| 151337 ||  || — || February 10, 2002 || Socorro || LINEAR || KOR || align=right | 2.9 km || 
|-id=338 bgcolor=#d6d6d6
| 151338 ||  || — || February 11, 2002 || Socorro || LINEAR || KOR || align=right | 2.5 km || 
|-id=339 bgcolor=#E9E9E9
| 151339 ||  || — || February 11, 2002 || Socorro || LINEAR || — || align=right | 5.6 km || 
|-id=340 bgcolor=#d6d6d6
| 151340 ||  || — || February 6, 2002 || Palomar || NEAT || NAE || align=right | 5.1 km || 
|-id=341 bgcolor=#d6d6d6
| 151341 ||  || — || February 12, 2002 || Kitt Peak || Spacewatch || KOR || align=right | 2.0 km || 
|-id=342 bgcolor=#d6d6d6
| 151342 ||  || — || February 8, 2002 || Socorro || LINEAR || — || align=right | 6.7 km || 
|-id=343 bgcolor=#d6d6d6
| 151343 ||  || — || February 11, 2002 || Socorro || LINEAR || — || align=right | 5.2 km || 
|-id=344 bgcolor=#d6d6d6
| 151344 ||  || — || February 13, 2002 || Kitt Peak || Spacewatch || — || align=right | 5.5 km || 
|-id=345 bgcolor=#d6d6d6
| 151345 ||  || — || February 15, 2002 || Socorro || LINEAR || — || align=right | 4.5 km || 
|-id=346 bgcolor=#d6d6d6
| 151346 ||  || — || February 6, 2002 || Socorro || LINEAR || Tj (2.98) || align=right | 6.5 km || 
|-id=347 bgcolor=#E9E9E9
| 151347 ||  || — || February 6, 2002 || Kitt Peak || Spacewatch || AGN || align=right | 1.6 km || 
|-id=348 bgcolor=#d6d6d6
| 151348 ||  || — || February 7, 2002 || Kitt Peak || Spacewatch || — || align=right | 2.9 km || 
|-id=349 bgcolor=#E9E9E9
| 151349 Stanleycooper ||  ||  || February 8, 2002 || Kitt Peak || M. W. Buie || — || align=right | 3.0 km || 
|-id=350 bgcolor=#d6d6d6
| 151350 ||  || — || February 7, 2002 || Kitt Peak || Spacewatch || HYG || align=right | 3.1 km || 
|-id=351 bgcolor=#d6d6d6
| 151351 Dalleore ||  ||  || February 8, 2002 || Kitt Peak || M. W. Buie || — || align=right | 3.9 km || 
|-id=352 bgcolor=#d6d6d6
| 151352 ||  || — || February 10, 2002 || Socorro || LINEAR || — || align=right | 3.6 km || 
|-id=353 bgcolor=#d6d6d6
| 151353 ||  || — || February 11, 2002 || Socorro || LINEAR || — || align=right | 3.8 km || 
|-id=354 bgcolor=#d6d6d6
| 151354 ||  || — || February 10, 2002 || Socorro || LINEAR || EOS || align=right | 3.2 km || 
|-id=355 bgcolor=#d6d6d6
| 151355 ||  || — || February 10, 2002 || Socorro || LINEAR || — || align=right | 4.0 km || 
|-id=356 bgcolor=#d6d6d6
| 151356 ||  || — || February 10, 2002 || Socorro || LINEAR || — || align=right | 3.7 km || 
|-id=357 bgcolor=#d6d6d6
| 151357 ||  || — || February 15, 2002 || Socorro || LINEAR || EOS || align=right | 3.5 km || 
|-id=358 bgcolor=#d6d6d6
| 151358 ||  || — || February 6, 2002 || Palomar || NEAT || — || align=right | 4.5 km || 
|-id=359 bgcolor=#d6d6d6
| 151359 ||  || — || February 10, 2002 || Socorro || LINEAR || — || align=right | 4.1 km || 
|-id=360 bgcolor=#d6d6d6
| 151360 ||  || — || February 15, 2002 || Socorro || LINEAR || — || align=right | 5.7 km || 
|-id=361 bgcolor=#d6d6d6
| 151361 ||  || — || February 12, 2002 || Socorro || LINEAR || — || align=right | 4.1 km || 
|-id=362 bgcolor=#d6d6d6
| 151362 Chenkegong ||  ||  || February 11, 2002 || Nanchuan || Q.-z. Ye || — || align=right | 4.4 km || 
|-id=363 bgcolor=#E9E9E9
| 151363 ||  || — || February 10, 2002 || Socorro || LINEAR || — || align=right | 4.4 km || 
|-id=364 bgcolor=#FA8072
| 151364 ||  || — || February 21, 2002 || Socorro || LINEAR || — || align=right | 1.1 km || 
|-id=365 bgcolor=#d6d6d6
| 151365 ||  || — || February 20, 2002 || Kitt Peak || Spacewatch || — || align=right | 3.8 km || 
|-id=366 bgcolor=#d6d6d6
| 151366 ||  || — || February 16, 2002 || Palomar || NEAT || URS || align=right | 7.2 km || 
|-id=367 bgcolor=#d6d6d6
| 151367 ||  || — || February 20, 2002 || Socorro || LINEAR || — || align=right | 6.6 km || 
|-id=368 bgcolor=#d6d6d6
| 151368 ||  || — || March 10, 2002 || Cima Ekar || ADAS || — || align=right | 4.5 km || 
|-id=369 bgcolor=#d6d6d6
| 151369 ||  || — || March 10, 2002 || Cima Ekar || ADAS || THM || align=right | 4.8 km || 
|-id=370 bgcolor=#d6d6d6
| 151370 ||  || — || March 10, 2002 || Cima Ekar || ADAS || — || align=right | 3.7 km || 
|-id=371 bgcolor=#d6d6d6
| 151371 ||  || — || March 5, 2002 || Haleakala || NEAT || — || align=right | 7.2 km || 
|-id=372 bgcolor=#d6d6d6
| 151372 ||  || — || March 5, 2002 || Palomar || NEAT || — || align=right | 4.7 km || 
|-id=373 bgcolor=#d6d6d6
| 151373 ||  || — || March 6, 2002 || Socorro || LINEAR || — || align=right | 4.6 km || 
|-id=374 bgcolor=#d6d6d6
| 151374 ||  || — || March 9, 2002 || Socorro || LINEAR || — || align=right | 6.8 km || 
|-id=375 bgcolor=#d6d6d6
| 151375 ||  || — || March 10, 2002 || Haleakala || NEAT || — || align=right | 5.5 km || 
|-id=376 bgcolor=#d6d6d6
| 151376 ||  || — || March 10, 2002 || Anderson Mesa || LONEOS || — || align=right | 5.5 km || 
|-id=377 bgcolor=#d6d6d6
| 151377 ||  || — || March 9, 2002 || Socorro || LINEAR || — || align=right | 4.9 km || 
|-id=378 bgcolor=#d6d6d6
| 151378 ||  || — || March 12, 2002 || Socorro || LINEAR || — || align=right | 5.4 km || 
|-id=379 bgcolor=#d6d6d6
| 151379 ||  || — || March 10, 2002 || Haleakala || NEAT || HYG || align=right | 5.0 km || 
|-id=380 bgcolor=#d6d6d6
| 151380 ||  || — || March 12, 2002 || Palomar || NEAT || EOS || align=right | 3.8 km || 
|-id=381 bgcolor=#d6d6d6
| 151381 ||  || — || March 12, 2002 || Palomar || NEAT || — || align=right | 4.5 km || 
|-id=382 bgcolor=#d6d6d6
| 151382 ||  || — || March 12, 2002 || Palomar || NEAT || LIX || align=right | 6.0 km || 
|-id=383 bgcolor=#d6d6d6
| 151383 ||  || — || March 13, 2002 || Socorro || LINEAR || — || align=right | 3.3 km || 
|-id=384 bgcolor=#d6d6d6
| 151384 ||  || — || March 13, 2002 || Socorro || LINEAR || KOR || align=right | 2.4 km || 
|-id=385 bgcolor=#d6d6d6
| 151385 ||  || — || March 13, 2002 || Socorro || LINEAR || HYG || align=right | 3.8 km || 
|-id=386 bgcolor=#d6d6d6
| 151386 ||  || — || March 13, 2002 || Socorro || LINEAR || — || align=right | 3.5 km || 
|-id=387 bgcolor=#d6d6d6
| 151387 ||  || — || March 13, 2002 || Socorro || LINEAR || — || align=right | 4.5 km || 
|-id=388 bgcolor=#d6d6d6
| 151388 ||  || — || March 13, 2002 || Socorro || LINEAR || — || align=right | 5.3 km || 
|-id=389 bgcolor=#d6d6d6
| 151389 ||  || — || March 13, 2002 || Socorro || LINEAR || — || align=right | 4.2 km || 
|-id=390 bgcolor=#d6d6d6
| 151390 ||  || — || March 13, 2002 || Socorro || LINEAR || HYG || align=right | 4.6 km || 
|-id=391 bgcolor=#d6d6d6
| 151391 ||  || — || March 13, 2002 || Socorro || LINEAR || — || align=right | 6.0 km || 
|-id=392 bgcolor=#d6d6d6
| 151392 ||  || — || March 11, 2002 || Kitt Peak || Spacewatch || — || align=right | 4.7 km || 
|-id=393 bgcolor=#d6d6d6
| 151393 ||  || — || March 11, 2002 || Haleakala || NEAT || HYG || align=right | 4.8 km || 
|-id=394 bgcolor=#d6d6d6
| 151394 ||  || — || March 12, 2002 || Palomar || NEAT || — || align=right | 3.7 km || 
|-id=395 bgcolor=#d6d6d6
| 151395 ||  || — || March 9, 2002 || Socorro || LINEAR || — || align=right | 5.1 km || 
|-id=396 bgcolor=#d6d6d6
| 151396 ||  || — || March 9, 2002 || Socorro || LINEAR || — || align=right | 6.7 km || 
|-id=397 bgcolor=#d6d6d6
| 151397 ||  || — || March 11, 2002 || Socorro || LINEAR || EOS || align=right | 3.6 km || 
|-id=398 bgcolor=#d6d6d6
| 151398 ||  || — || March 11, 2002 || Socorro || LINEAR || — || align=right | 6.8 km || 
|-id=399 bgcolor=#d6d6d6
| 151399 ||  || — || March 12, 2002 || Socorro || LINEAR || HYG || align=right | 4.2 km || 
|-id=400 bgcolor=#d6d6d6
| 151400 ||  || — || March 5, 2002 || Anderson Mesa || LONEOS || — || align=right | 6.2 km || 
|}

151401–151500 

|-bgcolor=#d6d6d6
| 151401 ||  || — || March 6, 2002 || Socorro || LINEAR || — || align=right | 4.6 km || 
|-id=402 bgcolor=#d6d6d6
| 151402 ||  || — || March 9, 2002 || Anderson Mesa || LONEOS || — || align=right | 5.6 km || 
|-id=403 bgcolor=#d6d6d6
| 151403 ||  || — || March 9, 2002 || Anderson Mesa || LONEOS || EMA || align=right | 6.0 km || 
|-id=404 bgcolor=#d6d6d6
| 151404 ||  || — || March 10, 2002 || Kitt Peak || Spacewatch || EUP || align=right | 6.2 km || 
|-id=405 bgcolor=#d6d6d6
| 151405 ||  || — || March 9, 2002 || Catalina || CSS || — || align=right | 6.2 km || 
|-id=406 bgcolor=#d6d6d6
| 151406 ||  || — || March 10, 2002 || Anderson Mesa || LONEOS || — || align=right | 5.3 km || 
|-id=407 bgcolor=#d6d6d6
| 151407 ||  || — || March 11, 2002 || Palomar || NEAT || KOR || align=right | 2.1 km || 
|-id=408 bgcolor=#d6d6d6
| 151408 ||  || — || March 11, 2002 || Kitt Peak || Spacewatch || URS || align=right | 6.1 km || 
|-id=409 bgcolor=#d6d6d6
| 151409 ||  || — || March 12, 2002 || Palomar || NEAT || — || align=right | 5.6 km || 
|-id=410 bgcolor=#d6d6d6
| 151410 ||  || — || March 12, 2002 || Palomar || NEAT || — || align=right | 5.3 km || 
|-id=411 bgcolor=#d6d6d6
| 151411 ||  || — || March 13, 2002 || Palomar || NEAT || — || align=right | 3.4 km || 
|-id=412 bgcolor=#d6d6d6
| 151412 ||  || — || March 12, 2002 || Palomar || NEAT || EOS || align=right | 3.2 km || 
|-id=413 bgcolor=#d6d6d6
| 151413 ||  || — || March 12, 2002 || Palomar || NEAT || — || align=right | 4.4 km || 
|-id=414 bgcolor=#d6d6d6
| 151414 ||  || — || March 12, 2002 || Kitt Peak || Spacewatch || — || align=right | 4.5 km || 
|-id=415 bgcolor=#d6d6d6
| 151415 ||  || — || March 12, 2002 || Palomar || NEAT || EOS || align=right | 3.1 km || 
|-id=416 bgcolor=#d6d6d6
| 151416 ||  || — || March 13, 2002 || Socorro || LINEAR || — || align=right | 4.9 km || 
|-id=417 bgcolor=#d6d6d6
| 151417 ||  || — || March 13, 2002 || Cima Ekar || ADAS || KOR || align=right | 2.2 km || 
|-id=418 bgcolor=#d6d6d6
| 151418 ||  || — || March 14, 2002 || Anderson Mesa || LONEOS || — || align=right | 4.2 km || 
|-id=419 bgcolor=#d6d6d6
| 151419 ||  || — || March 15, 2002 || Palomar || NEAT || — || align=right | 4.0 km || 
|-id=420 bgcolor=#d6d6d6
| 151420 ||  || — || March 15, 2002 || Kitt Peak || Spacewatch || — || align=right | 4.1 km || 
|-id=421 bgcolor=#d6d6d6
| 151421 ||  || — || March 15, 2002 || Kitt Peak || Spacewatch || — || align=right | 5.7 km || 
|-id=422 bgcolor=#d6d6d6
| 151422 || 2002 FH || — || March 16, 2002 || Desert Eagle || W. K. Y. Yeung || — || align=right | 6.5 km || 
|-id=423 bgcolor=#d6d6d6
| 151423 ||  || — || March 19, 2002 || Fountain Hills || Fountain Hills Obs. || — || align=right | 5.3 km || 
|-id=424 bgcolor=#d6d6d6
| 151424 ||  || — || March 19, 2002 || Fountain Hills || Fountain Hills Obs. || — || align=right | 6.5 km || 
|-id=425 bgcolor=#d6d6d6
| 151425 ||  || — || March 19, 2002 || Desert Eagle || W. K. Y. Yeung || VER || align=right | 6.1 km || 
|-id=426 bgcolor=#d6d6d6
| 151426 ||  || — || March 19, 2002 || Desert Eagle || W. K. Y. Yeung || — || align=right | 5.3 km || 
|-id=427 bgcolor=#fefefe
| 151427 ||  || — || March 16, 2002 || Socorro || LINEAR || H || align=right | 1.5 km || 
|-id=428 bgcolor=#d6d6d6
| 151428 ||  || — || March 17, 2002 || Socorro || LINEAR || — || align=right | 4.9 km || 
|-id=429 bgcolor=#d6d6d6
| 151429 ||  || — || March 16, 2002 || Haleakala || NEAT || — || align=right | 6.1 km || 
|-id=430 bgcolor=#d6d6d6
| 151430 Nemunas ||  ||  || March 16, 2002 || Moletai || K. Černis, J. Zdanavičius || THM || align=right | 3.2 km || 
|-id=431 bgcolor=#d6d6d6
| 151431 ||  || — || March 16, 2002 || Socorro || LINEAR || — || align=right | 3.2 km || 
|-id=432 bgcolor=#d6d6d6
| 151432 ||  || — || March 20, 2002 || Socorro || LINEAR || EOS || align=right | 3.6 km || 
|-id=433 bgcolor=#d6d6d6
| 151433 ||  || — || March 20, 2002 || Socorro || LINEAR || — || align=right | 4.7 km || 
|-id=434 bgcolor=#d6d6d6
| 151434 ||  || — || March 30, 2002 || Palomar || NEAT || HYG || align=right | 4.9 km || 
|-id=435 bgcolor=#d6d6d6
| 151435 ||  || — || March 16, 2002 || Socorro || LINEAR || — || align=right | 3.4 km || 
|-id=436 bgcolor=#d6d6d6
| 151436 ||  || — || April 6, 2002 || Kleť || Kleť Obs. || — || align=right | 6.2 km || 
|-id=437 bgcolor=#d6d6d6
| 151437 ||  || — || April 12, 2002 || Desert Eagle || W. K. Y. Yeung || URS || align=right | 7.0 km || 
|-id=438 bgcolor=#d6d6d6
| 151438 ||  || — || April 14, 2002 || Desert Eagle || W. K. Y. Yeung || HYG || align=right | 4.5 km || 
|-id=439 bgcolor=#d6d6d6
| 151439 ||  || — || April 14, 2002 || Palomar || NEAT || — || align=right | 4.5 km || 
|-id=440 bgcolor=#d6d6d6
| 151440 ||  || — || April 15, 2002 || Socorro || LINEAR || — || align=right | 4.7 km || 
|-id=441 bgcolor=#d6d6d6
| 151441 ||  || — || April 15, 2002 || Socorro || LINEAR || THM || align=right | 4.2 km || 
|-id=442 bgcolor=#d6d6d6
| 151442 ||  || — || April 14, 2002 || Socorro || LINEAR || — || align=right | 7.4 km || 
|-id=443 bgcolor=#d6d6d6
| 151443 ||  || — || April 1, 2002 || Palomar || NEAT || — || align=right | 5.1 km || 
|-id=444 bgcolor=#d6d6d6
| 151444 ||  || — || April 4, 2002 || Palomar || NEAT || — || align=right | 5.5 km || 
|-id=445 bgcolor=#d6d6d6
| 151445 ||  || — || April 5, 2002 || Palomar || NEAT || — || align=right | 6.5 km || 
|-id=446 bgcolor=#d6d6d6
| 151446 ||  || — || April 5, 2002 || Anderson Mesa || LONEOS || — || align=right | 4.4 km || 
|-id=447 bgcolor=#d6d6d6
| 151447 ||  || — || April 5, 2002 || Anderson Mesa || LONEOS || THM || align=right | 3.8 km || 
|-id=448 bgcolor=#d6d6d6
| 151448 ||  || — || April 9, 2002 || Socorro || LINEAR || — || align=right | 7.3 km || 
|-id=449 bgcolor=#d6d6d6
| 151449 ||  || — || April 9, 2002 || Socorro || LINEAR || HYG || align=right | 5.1 km || 
|-id=450 bgcolor=#d6d6d6
| 151450 ||  || — || April 10, 2002 || Socorro || LINEAR || — || align=right | 7.2 km || 
|-id=451 bgcolor=#d6d6d6
| 151451 ||  || — || April 10, 2002 || Socorro || LINEAR || — || align=right | 3.8 km || 
|-id=452 bgcolor=#d6d6d6
| 151452 ||  || — || April 10, 2002 || Socorro || LINEAR || — || align=right | 6.2 km || 
|-id=453 bgcolor=#d6d6d6
| 151453 ||  || — || April 10, 2002 || Socorro || LINEAR || — || align=right | 3.2 km || 
|-id=454 bgcolor=#d6d6d6
| 151454 ||  || — || April 10, 2002 || Socorro || LINEAR || URS || align=right | 6.1 km || 
|-id=455 bgcolor=#d6d6d6
| 151455 ||  || — || April 11, 2002 || Anderson Mesa || LONEOS || — || align=right | 5.3 km || 
|-id=456 bgcolor=#d6d6d6
| 151456 ||  || — || April 11, 2002 || Anderson Mesa || LONEOS || — || align=right | 5.3 km || 
|-id=457 bgcolor=#d6d6d6
| 151457 ||  || — || April 11, 2002 || Anderson Mesa || LONEOS || — || align=right | 3.6 km || 
|-id=458 bgcolor=#d6d6d6
| 151458 ||  || — || April 11, 2002 || Palomar || NEAT || ELF || align=right | 5.6 km || 
|-id=459 bgcolor=#d6d6d6
| 151459 ||  || — || April 11, 2002 || Palomar || NEAT || — || align=right | 6.6 km || 
|-id=460 bgcolor=#d6d6d6
| 151460 ||  || — || April 10, 2002 || Socorro || LINEAR || MEL || align=right | 5.7 km || 
|-id=461 bgcolor=#d6d6d6
| 151461 ||  || — || April 11, 2002 || Anderson Mesa || LONEOS || — || align=right | 6.1 km || 
|-id=462 bgcolor=#d6d6d6
| 151462 ||  || — || April 12, 2002 || Palomar || NEAT || — || align=right | 3.9 km || 
|-id=463 bgcolor=#d6d6d6
| 151463 ||  || — || April 10, 2002 || Socorro || LINEAR || — || align=right | 5.6 km || 
|-id=464 bgcolor=#d6d6d6
| 151464 ||  || — || April 12, 2002 || Socorro || LINEAR || — || align=right | 4.2 km || 
|-id=465 bgcolor=#d6d6d6
| 151465 ||  || — || April 13, 2002 || Kitt Peak || Spacewatch || — || align=right | 3.7 km || 
|-id=466 bgcolor=#d6d6d6
| 151466 ||  || — || April 14, 2002 || Socorro || LINEAR || — || align=right | 3.8 km || 
|-id=467 bgcolor=#d6d6d6
| 151467 ||  || — || April 12, 2002 || Palomar || NEAT || — || align=right | 4.8 km || 
|-id=468 bgcolor=#d6d6d6
| 151468 ||  || — || April 13, 2002 || Palomar || NEAT || 637 || align=right | 3.6 km || 
|-id=469 bgcolor=#d6d6d6
| 151469 ||  || — || April 13, 2002 || Palomar || NEAT || — || align=right | 4.8 km || 
|-id=470 bgcolor=#d6d6d6
| 151470 ||  || — || April 15, 2002 || Palomar || NEAT || EUP || align=right | 5.8 km || 
|-id=471 bgcolor=#d6d6d6
| 151471 ||  || — || April 15, 2002 || Anderson Mesa || LONEOS || — || align=right | 7.7 km || 
|-id=472 bgcolor=#d6d6d6
| 151472 ||  || — || April 9, 2002 || Socorro || LINEAR || HYG || align=right | 5.2 km || 
|-id=473 bgcolor=#d6d6d6
| 151473 ||  || — || April 9, 2002 || Socorro || LINEAR || — || align=right | 4.1 km || 
|-id=474 bgcolor=#d6d6d6
| 151474 ||  || — || April 16, 2002 || Socorro || LINEAR || — || align=right | 7.3 km || 
|-id=475 bgcolor=#d6d6d6
| 151475 ||  || — || April 21, 2002 || Palomar || NEAT || ALA || align=right | 5.9 km || 
|-id=476 bgcolor=#fefefe
| 151476 ||  || — || April 22, 2002 || Socorro || LINEAR || H || align=right | 1.5 km || 
|-id=477 bgcolor=#d6d6d6
| 151477 ||  || — || April 18, 2002 || Kitt Peak || Spacewatch || THM || align=right | 4.4 km || 
|-id=478 bgcolor=#d6d6d6
| 151478 || 2002 JR || — || May 3, 2002 || Desert Eagle || W. K. Y. Yeung || — || align=right | 5.6 km || 
|-id=479 bgcolor=#d6d6d6
| 151479 ||  || — || May 5, 2002 || Socorro || LINEAR || EUP || align=right | 10 km || 
|-id=480 bgcolor=#fefefe
| 151480 ||  || — || May 5, 2002 || Socorro || LINEAR || H || align=right | 1.5 km || 
|-id=481 bgcolor=#d6d6d6
| 151481 ||  || — || May 6, 2002 || Socorro || LINEAR || ALA || align=right | 6.7 km || 
|-id=482 bgcolor=#d6d6d6
| 151482 ||  || — || May 6, 2002 || Socorro || LINEAR || TIR || align=right | 5.0 km || 
|-id=483 bgcolor=#fefefe
| 151483 ||  || — || May 7, 2002 || Socorro || LINEAR || H || align=right data-sort-value="0.95" | 950 m || 
|-id=484 bgcolor=#d6d6d6
| 151484 ||  || — || May 6, 2002 || Palomar || NEAT || EOS || align=right | 3.7 km || 
|-id=485 bgcolor=#d6d6d6
| 151485 ||  || — || May 7, 2002 || Palomar || NEAT || HYG || align=right | 5.6 km || 
|-id=486 bgcolor=#d6d6d6
| 151486 ||  || — || May 8, 2002 || Socorro || LINEAR || — || align=right | 5.9 km || 
|-id=487 bgcolor=#d6d6d6
| 151487 ||  || — || May 8, 2002 || Socorro || LINEAR || THM || align=right | 4.3 km || 
|-id=488 bgcolor=#d6d6d6
| 151488 ||  || — || May 8, 2002 || Socorro || LINEAR || — || align=right | 5.9 km || 
|-id=489 bgcolor=#d6d6d6
| 151489 ||  || — || May 9, 2002 || Socorro || LINEAR || HYG || align=right | 5.7 km || 
|-id=490 bgcolor=#d6d6d6
| 151490 ||  || — || May 9, 2002 || Socorro || LINEAR || HYG || align=right | 4.4 km || 
|-id=491 bgcolor=#d6d6d6
| 151491 ||  || — || May 9, 2002 || Socorro || LINEAR || — || align=right | 6.7 km || 
|-id=492 bgcolor=#d6d6d6
| 151492 ||  || — || May 9, 2002 || Socorro || LINEAR || — || align=right | 6.0 km || 
|-id=493 bgcolor=#fefefe
| 151493 ||  || — || May 9, 2002 || Socorro || LINEAR || H || align=right data-sort-value="0.94" | 940 m || 
|-id=494 bgcolor=#d6d6d6
| 151494 ||  || — || May 6, 2002 || Socorro || LINEAR || INA || align=right | 5.9 km || 
|-id=495 bgcolor=#d6d6d6
| 151495 ||  || — || May 7, 2002 || Socorro || LINEAR || — || align=right | 8.9 km || 
|-id=496 bgcolor=#d6d6d6
| 151496 ||  || — || May 8, 2002 || Socorro || LINEAR || LIX || align=right | 6.9 km || 
|-id=497 bgcolor=#d6d6d6
| 151497 ||  || — || May 11, 2002 || Socorro || LINEAR || — || align=right | 6.2 km || 
|-id=498 bgcolor=#d6d6d6
| 151498 ||  || — || May 11, 2002 || Socorro || LINEAR || HYG || align=right | 4.6 km || 
|-id=499 bgcolor=#d6d6d6
| 151499 ||  || — || May 6, 2002 || Kvistaberg || UDAS || — || align=right | 7.5 km || 
|-id=500 bgcolor=#d6d6d6
| 151500 ||  || — || May 14, 2002 || Palomar || NEAT || EUP || align=right | 7.9 km || 
|}

151501–151600 

|-bgcolor=#d6d6d6
| 151501 ||  || — || May 5, 2002 || Palomar || NEAT || ALA || align=right | 5.6 km || 
|-id=502 bgcolor=#d6d6d6
| 151502 ||  || — || May 6, 2002 || Palomar || NEAT || — || align=right | 5.2 km || 
|-id=503 bgcolor=#d6d6d6
| 151503 ||  || — || May 7, 2002 || Palomar || NEAT || HYG || align=right | 4.4 km || 
|-id=504 bgcolor=#d6d6d6
| 151504 ||  || — || May 30, 2002 || Palomar || NEAT || LUT || align=right | 7.2 km || 
|-id=505 bgcolor=#fefefe
| 151505 ||  || — || June 10, 2002 || Socorro || LINEAR || — || align=right | 1.7 km || 
|-id=506 bgcolor=#fefefe
| 151506 ||  || — || June 11, 2002 || Anderson Mesa || LONEOS || — || align=right | 1.6 km || 
|-id=507 bgcolor=#fefefe
| 151507 ||  || — || June 18, 2002 || Socorro || LINEAR || H || align=right | 1.2 km || 
|-id=508 bgcolor=#fefefe
| 151508 ||  || — || July 13, 2002 || Haleakala || NEAT || ERI || align=right | 3.2 km || 
|-id=509 bgcolor=#fefefe
| 151509 ||  || — || July 14, 2002 || Palomar || NEAT || NYS || align=right data-sort-value="0.93" | 930 m || 
|-id=510 bgcolor=#fefefe
| 151510 ||  || — || July 15, 2002 || Palomar || NEAT || — || align=right data-sort-value="0.87" | 870 m || 
|-id=511 bgcolor=#fefefe
| 151511 ||  || — || August 6, 2002 || Palomar || NEAT || V || align=right data-sort-value="0.89" | 890 m || 
|-id=512 bgcolor=#fefefe
| 151512 ||  || — || August 6, 2002 || Palomar || NEAT || — || align=right data-sort-value="0.89" | 890 m || 
|-id=513 bgcolor=#fefefe
| 151513 ||  || — || August 5, 2002 || Socorro || LINEAR || — || align=right | 1.5 km || 
|-id=514 bgcolor=#fefefe
| 151514 ||  || — || August 8, 2002 || Palomar || NEAT || — || align=right | 1.1 km || 
|-id=515 bgcolor=#fefefe
| 151515 ||  || — || August 11, 2002 || Socorro || LINEAR || H || align=right data-sort-value="0.95" | 950 m || 
|-id=516 bgcolor=#fefefe
| 151516 ||  || — || August 11, 2002 || Palomar || NEAT || NYS || align=right | 1.2 km || 
|-id=517 bgcolor=#FA8072
| 151517 ||  || — || August 15, 2002 || Socorro || LINEAR || — || align=right | 2.5 km || 
|-id=518 bgcolor=#fefefe
| 151518 ||  || — || August 14, 2002 || Socorro || LINEAR || — || align=right data-sort-value="0.93" | 930 m || 
|-id=519 bgcolor=#fefefe
| 151519 ||  || — || August 30, 2002 || Ametlla de Mar || Ametlla de Mar Obs. || FLO || align=right | 1.8 km || 
|-id=520 bgcolor=#fefefe
| 151520 ||  || — || September 1, 2002 || Haleakala || NEAT || FLO || align=right data-sort-value="0.99" | 990 m || 
|-id=521 bgcolor=#fefefe
| 151521 ||  || — || September 4, 2002 || Anderson Mesa || LONEOS || — || align=right | 1.2 km || 
|-id=522 bgcolor=#fefefe
| 151522 ||  || — || September 4, 2002 || Anderson Mesa || LONEOS || — || align=right | 1.2 km || 
|-id=523 bgcolor=#fefefe
| 151523 ||  || — || September 5, 2002 || Anderson Mesa || LONEOS || — || align=right | 2.3 km || 
|-id=524 bgcolor=#fefefe
| 151524 ||  || — || September 5, 2002 || Socorro || LINEAR || FLO || align=right | 1.6 km || 
|-id=525 bgcolor=#FA8072
| 151525 ||  || — || September 5, 2002 || Socorro || LINEAR || — || align=right data-sort-value="0.90" | 900 m || 
|-id=526 bgcolor=#fefefe
| 151526 ||  || — || September 5, 2002 || Socorro || LINEAR || — || align=right | 1.1 km || 
|-id=527 bgcolor=#fefefe
| 151527 ||  || — || September 3, 2002 || Palomar || NEAT || — || align=right | 1.5 km || 
|-id=528 bgcolor=#fefefe
| 151528 ||  || — || September 4, 2002 || Anderson Mesa || LONEOS || — || align=right data-sort-value="0.99" | 990 m || 
|-id=529 bgcolor=#fefefe
| 151529 ||  || — || September 5, 2002 || Socorro || LINEAR || NYS || align=right data-sort-value="0.88" | 880 m || 
|-id=530 bgcolor=#fefefe
| 151530 ||  || — || September 5, 2002 || Anderson Mesa || LONEOS || — || align=right | 1.3 km || 
|-id=531 bgcolor=#fefefe
| 151531 ||  || — || September 5, 2002 || Socorro || LINEAR || FLO || align=right | 1.4 km || 
|-id=532 bgcolor=#fefefe
| 151532 ||  || — || September 5, 2002 || Socorro || LINEAR || — || align=right | 1.6 km || 
|-id=533 bgcolor=#fefefe
| 151533 ||  || — || September 5, 2002 || Socorro || LINEAR || MAS || align=right | 1.1 km || 
|-id=534 bgcolor=#fefefe
| 151534 ||  || — || September 5, 2002 || Socorro || LINEAR || FLO || align=right | 1.0 km || 
|-id=535 bgcolor=#fefefe
| 151535 ||  || — || September 6, 2002 || Socorro || LINEAR || — || align=right | 1.1 km || 
|-id=536 bgcolor=#fefefe
| 151536 ||  || — || September 8, 2002 || Haleakala || NEAT || FLO || align=right | 1.9 km || 
|-id=537 bgcolor=#fefefe
| 151537 ||  || — || September 11, 2002 || Haleakala || NEAT || — || align=right | 1.6 km || 
|-id=538 bgcolor=#fefefe
| 151538 ||  || — || September 10, 2002 || Haleakala || NEAT || FLO || align=right | 1.2 km || 
|-id=539 bgcolor=#fefefe
| 151539 ||  || — || September 14, 2002 || Kitt Peak || Spacewatch || — || align=right data-sort-value="0.94" | 940 m || 
|-id=540 bgcolor=#fefefe
| 151540 ||  || — || September 27, 2002 || Palomar || NEAT || — || align=right | 1.1 km || 
|-id=541 bgcolor=#fefefe
| 151541 ||  || — || September 27, 2002 || Palomar || NEAT || NYS || align=right | 2.4 km || 
|-id=542 bgcolor=#fefefe
| 151542 ||  || — || September 28, 2002 || Haleakala || NEAT || PHO || align=right | 2.1 km || 
|-id=543 bgcolor=#fefefe
| 151543 ||  || — || September 29, 2002 || Kitt Peak || Spacewatch || — || align=right | 1.1 km || 
|-id=544 bgcolor=#fefefe
| 151544 ||  || — || September 30, 2002 || Socorro || LINEAR || NYS || align=right | 1.0 km || 
|-id=545 bgcolor=#fefefe
| 151545 ||  || — || September 30, 2002 || Socorro || LINEAR || FLO || align=right data-sort-value="0.99" | 990 m || 
|-id=546 bgcolor=#fefefe
| 151546 ||  || — || September 30, 2002 || Socorro || LINEAR || FLO || align=right | 1.4 km || 
|-id=547 bgcolor=#fefefe
| 151547 ||  || — || September 30, 2002 || Socorro || LINEAR || — || align=right | 1.0 km || 
|-id=548 bgcolor=#fefefe
| 151548 ||  || — || September 30, 2002 || Haleakala || NEAT || — || align=right | 1.1 km || 
|-id=549 bgcolor=#fefefe
| 151549 ||  || — || October 1, 2002 || Socorro || LINEAR || — || align=right | 1.3 km || 
|-id=550 bgcolor=#fefefe
| 151550 ||  || — || October 1, 2002 || Anderson Mesa || LONEOS || — || align=right | 1.4 km || 
|-id=551 bgcolor=#fefefe
| 151551 ||  || — || October 2, 2002 || Socorro || LINEAR || — || align=right | 1.8 km || 
|-id=552 bgcolor=#fefefe
| 151552 ||  || — || October 2, 2002 || Socorro || LINEAR || — || align=right data-sort-value="0.82" | 820 m || 
|-id=553 bgcolor=#fefefe
| 151553 ||  || — || October 2, 2002 || Socorro || LINEAR || FLO || align=right data-sort-value="0.98" | 980 m || 
|-id=554 bgcolor=#fefefe
| 151554 ||  || — || October 2, 2002 || Socorro || LINEAR || — || align=right data-sort-value="0.99" | 990 m || 
|-id=555 bgcolor=#E9E9E9
| 151555 ||  || — || October 2, 2002 || Socorro || LINEAR || — || align=right | 1.8 km || 
|-id=556 bgcolor=#fefefe
| 151556 ||  || — || October 2, 2002 || Socorro || LINEAR || FLO || align=right | 1.5 km || 
|-id=557 bgcolor=#fefefe
| 151557 ||  || — || October 1, 2002 || Črni Vrh || Črni Vrh || FLO || align=right | 2.1 km || 
|-id=558 bgcolor=#fefefe
| 151558 ||  || — || October 1, 2002 || Anderson Mesa || LONEOS || FLO || align=right | 1.9 km || 
|-id=559 bgcolor=#fefefe
| 151559 ||  || — || October 1, 2002 || Anderson Mesa || LONEOS || NYS || align=right | 1.2 km || 
|-id=560 bgcolor=#fefefe
| 151560 ||  || — || October 2, 2002 || Socorro || LINEAR || — || align=right | 1.00 km || 
|-id=561 bgcolor=#fefefe
| 151561 ||  || — || October 3, 2002 || Socorro || LINEAR || — || align=right | 1.3 km || 
|-id=562 bgcolor=#fefefe
| 151562 ||  || — || October 4, 2002 || Socorro || LINEAR || FLO || align=right data-sort-value="0.92" | 920 m || 
|-id=563 bgcolor=#fefefe
| 151563 ||  || — || October 4, 2002 || Socorro || LINEAR || FLO || align=right | 1.0 km || 
|-id=564 bgcolor=#fefefe
| 151564 ||  || — || October 2, 2002 || Haleakala || NEAT || — || align=right | 2.3 km || 
|-id=565 bgcolor=#fefefe
| 151565 ||  || — || October 3, 2002 || Socorro || LINEAR || — || align=right | 1.4 km || 
|-id=566 bgcolor=#E9E9E9
| 151566 ||  || — || October 3, 2002 || Palomar || NEAT || — || align=right | 1.8 km || 
|-id=567 bgcolor=#fefefe
| 151567 ||  || — || October 4, 2002 || Socorro || LINEAR || — || align=right | 1.0 km || 
|-id=568 bgcolor=#fefefe
| 151568 ||  || — || October 5, 2002 || Socorro || LINEAR || V || align=right | 1.3 km || 
|-id=569 bgcolor=#fefefe
| 151569 ||  || — || October 4, 2002 || Socorro || LINEAR || — || align=right | 1.4 km || 
|-id=570 bgcolor=#fefefe
| 151570 ||  || — || October 4, 2002 || Socorro || LINEAR || — || align=right | 1.5 km || 
|-id=571 bgcolor=#fefefe
| 151571 ||  || — || October 7, 2002 || Socorro || LINEAR || — || align=right | 1.1 km || 
|-id=572 bgcolor=#E9E9E9
| 151572 ||  || — || October 7, 2002 || Socorro || LINEAR || — || align=right | 2.0 km || 
|-id=573 bgcolor=#E9E9E9
| 151573 ||  || — || October 8, 2002 || Anderson Mesa || LONEOS || — || align=right | 2.0 km || 
|-id=574 bgcolor=#fefefe
| 151574 ||  || — || October 8, 2002 || Anderson Mesa || LONEOS || FLO || align=right | 1.2 km || 
|-id=575 bgcolor=#fefefe
| 151575 ||  || — || October 8, 2002 || Anderson Mesa || LONEOS || — || align=right | 1.3 km || 
|-id=576 bgcolor=#fefefe
| 151576 ||  || — || October 9, 2002 || Anderson Mesa || LONEOS || — || align=right | 1.6 km || 
|-id=577 bgcolor=#E9E9E9
| 151577 ||  || — || October 9, 2002 || Kitt Peak || Spacewatch || — || align=right | 1.5 km || 
|-id=578 bgcolor=#fefefe
| 151578 ||  || — || October 7, 2002 || Socorro || LINEAR || — || align=right | 1.3 km || 
|-id=579 bgcolor=#fefefe
| 151579 ||  || — || October 9, 2002 || Socorro || LINEAR || — || align=right | 1.0 km || 
|-id=580 bgcolor=#fefefe
| 151580 ||  || — || October 9, 2002 || Socorro || LINEAR || — || align=right | 1.3 km || 
|-id=581 bgcolor=#fefefe
| 151581 ||  || — || October 10, 2002 || Socorro || LINEAR || — || align=right | 1.5 km || 
|-id=582 bgcolor=#fefefe
| 151582 ||  || — || October 9, 2002 || Socorro || LINEAR || — || align=right | 1.1 km || 
|-id=583 bgcolor=#fefefe
| 151583 ||  || — || October 10, 2002 || Socorro || LINEAR || V || align=right | 1.6 km || 
|-id=584 bgcolor=#fefefe
| 151584 ||  || — || October 11, 2002 || Socorro || LINEAR || — || align=right | 1.1 km || 
|-id=585 bgcolor=#fefefe
| 151585 ||  || — || October 28, 2002 || Kitt Peak || Spacewatch || — || align=right | 1.2 km || 
|-id=586 bgcolor=#E9E9E9
| 151586 ||  || — || October 30, 2002 || Palomar || NEAT || — || align=right | 1.6 km || 
|-id=587 bgcolor=#fefefe
| 151587 ||  || — || October 30, 2002 || Haleakala || NEAT || V || align=right data-sort-value="0.91" | 910 m || 
|-id=588 bgcolor=#fefefe
| 151588 ||  || — || October 29, 2002 || Fountain Hills || Fountain Hills Obs. || — || align=right | 1.0 km || 
|-id=589 bgcolor=#E9E9E9
| 151589 ||  || — || October 31, 2002 || Socorro || LINEAR || — || align=right | 2.2 km || 
|-id=590 bgcolor=#fefefe
| 151590 Fan ||  ||  || October 29, 2002 || Apache Point || SDSS || V || align=right | 1.2 km || 
|-id=591 bgcolor=#fefefe
| 151591 ||  || — || November 1, 2002 || Palomar || NEAT || V || align=right data-sort-value="0.99" | 990 m || 
|-id=592 bgcolor=#E9E9E9
| 151592 ||  || — || November 1, 2002 || Palomar || NEAT || — || align=right | 1.7 km || 
|-id=593 bgcolor=#fefefe
| 151593 ||  || — || November 5, 2002 || Socorro || LINEAR || FLO || align=right data-sort-value="0.96" | 960 m || 
|-id=594 bgcolor=#fefefe
| 151594 ||  || — || November 5, 2002 || Socorro || LINEAR || — || align=right | 1.5 km || 
|-id=595 bgcolor=#fefefe
| 151595 ||  || — || November 5, 2002 || Socorro || LINEAR || — || align=right | 1.3 km || 
|-id=596 bgcolor=#fefefe
| 151596 ||  || — || November 5, 2002 || Socorro || LINEAR || — || align=right | 1.8 km || 
|-id=597 bgcolor=#fefefe
| 151597 ||  || — || November 2, 2002 || Haleakala || NEAT || FLO || align=right | 1.00 km || 
|-id=598 bgcolor=#fefefe
| 151598 ||  || — || November 4, 2002 || Palomar || NEAT || FLO || align=right data-sort-value="0.93" | 930 m || 
|-id=599 bgcolor=#fefefe
| 151599 ||  || — || November 5, 2002 || Socorro || LINEAR || — || align=right | 1.4 km || 
|-id=600 bgcolor=#fefefe
| 151600 ||  || — || November 4, 2002 || Haleakala || NEAT || V || align=right | 1.0 km || 
|}

151601–151700 

|-bgcolor=#E9E9E9
| 151601 ||  || — || November 5, 2002 || Anderson Mesa || LONEOS || — || align=right | 1.2 km || 
|-id=602 bgcolor=#fefefe
| 151602 ||  || — || November 5, 2002 || Socorro || LINEAR || — || align=right | 1.1 km || 
|-id=603 bgcolor=#fefefe
| 151603 ||  || — || November 6, 2002 || Anderson Mesa || LONEOS || FLO || align=right | 1.1 km || 
|-id=604 bgcolor=#fefefe
| 151604 ||  || — || November 5, 2002 || Socorro || LINEAR || — || align=right | 2.6 km || 
|-id=605 bgcolor=#fefefe
| 151605 ||  || — || November 5, 2002 || Socorro || LINEAR || FLO || align=right | 1.2 km || 
|-id=606 bgcolor=#fefefe
| 151606 ||  || — || November 5, 2002 || Socorro || LINEAR || NYS || align=right | 1.1 km || 
|-id=607 bgcolor=#fefefe
| 151607 ||  || — || November 7, 2002 || Socorro || LINEAR || FLO || align=right | 1.0 km || 
|-id=608 bgcolor=#fefefe
| 151608 ||  || — || November 7, 2002 || Socorro || LINEAR || — || align=right | 1.2 km || 
|-id=609 bgcolor=#fefefe
| 151609 ||  || — || November 7, 2002 || Socorro || LINEAR || — || align=right | 1.1 km || 
|-id=610 bgcolor=#fefefe
| 151610 ||  || — || November 7, 2002 || Socorro || LINEAR || — || align=right | 1.4 km || 
|-id=611 bgcolor=#fefefe
| 151611 ||  || — || November 7, 2002 || Socorro || LINEAR || V || align=right | 1.1 km || 
|-id=612 bgcolor=#fefefe
| 151612 ||  || — || November 7, 2002 || Socorro || LINEAR || — || align=right | 5.9 km || 
|-id=613 bgcolor=#fefefe
| 151613 ||  || — || November 12, 2002 || Socorro || LINEAR || V || align=right | 1.2 km || 
|-id=614 bgcolor=#fefefe
| 151614 ||  || — || November 12, 2002 || Socorro || LINEAR || V || align=right | 1.2 km || 
|-id=615 bgcolor=#fefefe
| 151615 ||  || — || November 12, 2002 || Socorro || LINEAR || — || align=right | 1.4 km || 
|-id=616 bgcolor=#fefefe
| 151616 ||  || — || November 13, 2002 || Palomar || NEAT || FLO || align=right | 3.1 km || 
|-id=617 bgcolor=#fefefe
| 151617 ||  || — || November 11, 2002 || Anderson Mesa || LONEOS || FLO || align=right | 1.4 km || 
|-id=618 bgcolor=#fefefe
| 151618 ||  || — || November 12, 2002 || Socorro || LINEAR || — || align=right | 1.5 km || 
|-id=619 bgcolor=#fefefe
| 151619 ||  || — || November 12, 2002 || Socorro || LINEAR || ERI || align=right | 2.2 km || 
|-id=620 bgcolor=#fefefe
| 151620 ||  || — || November 12, 2002 || Socorro || LINEAR || — || align=right | 1.6 km || 
|-id=621 bgcolor=#fefefe
| 151621 ||  || — || November 13, 2002 || Palomar || NEAT || MAS || align=right data-sort-value="0.98" | 980 m || 
|-id=622 bgcolor=#fefefe
| 151622 ||  || — || November 13, 2002 || Palomar || NEAT || — || align=right | 1.2 km || 
|-id=623 bgcolor=#fefefe
| 151623 ||  || — || November 13, 2002 || Palomar || NEAT || — || align=right | 1.3 km || 
|-id=624 bgcolor=#fefefe
| 151624 ||  || — || November 24, 2002 || Palomar || NEAT || V || align=right | 1.1 km || 
|-id=625 bgcolor=#fefefe
| 151625 ||  || — || November 24, 2002 || Palomar || NEAT || MAS || align=right data-sort-value="0.90" | 900 m || 
|-id=626 bgcolor=#fefefe
| 151626 ||  || — || November 24, 2002 || Palomar || NEAT || NYS || align=right | 1.1 km || 
|-id=627 bgcolor=#fefefe
| 151627 ||  || — || November 27, 2002 || Anderson Mesa || LONEOS || — || align=right | 1.7 km || 
|-id=628 bgcolor=#fefefe
| 151628 ||  || — || November 28, 2002 || Haleakala || NEAT || — || align=right | 1.5 km || 
|-id=629 bgcolor=#fefefe
| 151629 ||  || — || November 30, 2002 || Socorro || LINEAR || — || align=right | 2.8 km || 
|-id=630 bgcolor=#fefefe
| 151630 ||  || — || November 24, 2002 || Palomar || S. F. Hönig || — || align=right | 1.2 km || 
|-id=631 bgcolor=#fefefe
| 151631 || 2002 XN || — || December 1, 2002 || Socorro || LINEAR || V || align=right data-sort-value="0.96" | 960 m || 
|-id=632 bgcolor=#fefefe
| 151632 ||  || — || December 1, 2002 || Socorro || LINEAR || FLO || align=right | 1.1 km || 
|-id=633 bgcolor=#fefefe
| 151633 ||  || — || December 2, 2002 || Socorro || LINEAR || V || align=right | 1.2 km || 
|-id=634 bgcolor=#fefefe
| 151634 ||  || — || December 2, 2002 || Socorro || LINEAR || — || align=right | 1.1 km || 
|-id=635 bgcolor=#fefefe
| 151635 ||  || — || December 3, 2002 || Haleakala || NEAT || NYS || align=right data-sort-value="0.85" | 850 m || 
|-id=636 bgcolor=#fefefe
| 151636 ||  || — || December 5, 2002 || Socorro || LINEAR || — || align=right | 1.2 km || 
|-id=637 bgcolor=#E9E9E9
| 151637 ||  || — || December 5, 2002 || Socorro || LINEAR || — || align=right | 1.5 km || 
|-id=638 bgcolor=#fefefe
| 151638 ||  || — || December 5, 2002 || Socorro || LINEAR || — || align=right | 1.2 km || 
|-id=639 bgcolor=#fefefe
| 151639 ||  || — || December 6, 2002 || Socorro || LINEAR || — || align=right | 1.3 km || 
|-id=640 bgcolor=#fefefe
| 151640 ||  || — || December 6, 2002 || Socorro || LINEAR || — || align=right | 1.2 km || 
|-id=641 bgcolor=#d6d6d6
| 151641 ||  || — || December 6, 2002 || Socorro || LINEAR || EOS || align=right | 3.4 km || 
|-id=642 bgcolor=#E9E9E9
| 151642 ||  || — || December 10, 2002 || Socorro || LINEAR || — || align=right | 3.8 km || 
|-id=643 bgcolor=#fefefe
| 151643 ||  || — || December 10, 2002 || Palomar || NEAT || NYS || align=right | 2.7 km || 
|-id=644 bgcolor=#fefefe
| 151644 ||  || — || December 10, 2002 || Socorro || LINEAR || — || align=right | 1.6 km || 
|-id=645 bgcolor=#fefefe
| 151645 ||  || — || December 10, 2002 || Socorro || LINEAR || — || align=right | 1.4 km || 
|-id=646 bgcolor=#fefefe
| 151646 ||  || — || December 12, 2002 || Socorro || LINEAR || PHO || align=right | 2.1 km || 
|-id=647 bgcolor=#fefefe
| 151647 ||  || — || December 12, 2002 || Socorro || LINEAR || NYS || align=right | 1.5 km || 
|-id=648 bgcolor=#fefefe
| 151648 ||  || — || December 10, 2002 || Socorro || LINEAR || — || align=right | 1.9 km || 
|-id=649 bgcolor=#fefefe
| 151649 ||  || — || December 10, 2002 || Socorro || LINEAR || — || align=right | 1.1 km || 
|-id=650 bgcolor=#fefefe
| 151650 ||  || — || December 11, 2002 || Socorro || LINEAR || — || align=right | 1.6 km || 
|-id=651 bgcolor=#fefefe
| 151651 ||  || — || December 14, 2002 || Socorro || LINEAR || NYS || align=right | 3.2 km || 
|-id=652 bgcolor=#fefefe
| 151652 ||  || — || December 5, 2002 || Socorro || LINEAR || NYS || align=right | 1.2 km || 
|-id=653 bgcolor=#fefefe
| 151653 ||  || — || December 3, 2002 || Palomar || S. F. Hönig || V || align=right data-sort-value="0.87" | 870 m || 
|-id=654 bgcolor=#fefefe
| 151654 ||  || — || December 5, 2002 || Socorro || LINEAR || MAS || align=right data-sort-value="0.90" | 900 m || 
|-id=655 bgcolor=#fefefe
| 151655 ||  || — || December 5, 2002 || Socorro || LINEAR || — || align=right | 1.6 km || 
|-id=656 bgcolor=#fefefe
| 151656 ||  || — || December 10, 2002 || Palomar || NEAT || — || align=right data-sort-value="0.91" | 910 m || 
|-id=657 bgcolor=#E9E9E9
| 151657 Finkbeiner ||  ||  || December 11, 2002 || Apache Point || SDSS || — || align=right | 1.9 km || 
|-id=658 bgcolor=#fefefe
| 151658 || 2002 YK || — || December 27, 2002 || Anderson Mesa || LONEOS || — || align=right | 3.9 km || 
|-id=659 bgcolor=#E9E9E9
| 151659 Egerszegi ||  ||  || December 25, 2002 || Piszkéstető || K. Sárneczky || MAR || align=right | 1.8 km || 
|-id=660 bgcolor=#E9E9E9
| 151660 ||  || — || December 28, 2002 || Kitt Peak || Spacewatch || — || align=right | 4.0 km || 
|-id=661 bgcolor=#fefefe
| 151661 ||  || — || December 30, 2002 || Socorro || LINEAR || — || align=right | 1.7 km || 
|-id=662 bgcolor=#fefefe
| 151662 ||  || — || December 31, 2002 || Socorro || LINEAR || NYS || align=right | 1.1 km || 
|-id=663 bgcolor=#E9E9E9
| 151663 ||  || — || December 31, 2002 || Socorro || LINEAR || — || align=right | 3.5 km || 
|-id=664 bgcolor=#fefefe
| 151664 ||  || — || December 31, 2002 || Kitt Peak || Spacewatch || — || align=right | 1.5 km || 
|-id=665 bgcolor=#fefefe
| 151665 ||  || — || December 31, 2002 || Socorro || LINEAR || NYS || align=right | 1.0 km || 
|-id=666 bgcolor=#fefefe
| 151666 ||  || — || December 31, 2002 || Socorro || LINEAR || — || align=right | 1.6 km || 
|-id=667 bgcolor=#E9E9E9
| 151667 ||  || — || December 31, 2002 || Socorro || LINEAR || — || align=right | 2.2 km || 
|-id=668 bgcolor=#fefefe
| 151668 ||  || — || December 31, 2002 || Socorro || LINEAR || — || align=right | 2.9 km || 
|-id=669 bgcolor=#fefefe
| 151669 ||  || — || December 31, 2002 || Socorro || LINEAR || NYS || align=right | 1.1 km || 
|-id=670 bgcolor=#fefefe
| 151670 ||  || — || December 31, 2002 || Socorro || LINEAR || EUT || align=right | 1.3 km || 
|-id=671 bgcolor=#fefefe
| 151671 ||  || — || December 31, 2002 || Socorro || LINEAR || NYS || align=right | 1.3 km || 
|-id=672 bgcolor=#fefefe
| 151672 || 2003 AU || — || January 1, 2003 || Socorro || LINEAR || V || align=right | 1.1 km || 
|-id=673 bgcolor=#fefefe
| 151673 ||  || — || January 1, 2003 || Socorro || LINEAR || NYS || align=right | 2.2 km || 
|-id=674 bgcolor=#fefefe
| 151674 ||  || — || January 1, 2003 || Kitt Peak || Spacewatch || NYS || align=right | 1.2 km || 
|-id=675 bgcolor=#fefefe
| 151675 ||  || — || January 2, 2003 || Socorro || LINEAR || NYS || align=right data-sort-value="0.95" | 950 m || 
|-id=676 bgcolor=#fefefe
| 151676 ||  || — || January 1, 2003 || Socorro || LINEAR || — || align=right | 1.4 km || 
|-id=677 bgcolor=#fefefe
| 151677 ||  || — || January 1, 2003 || Socorro || LINEAR || — || align=right | 1.8 km || 
|-id=678 bgcolor=#fefefe
| 151678 ||  || — || January 4, 2003 || Socorro || LINEAR || FLO || align=right | 1.2 km || 
|-id=679 bgcolor=#E9E9E9
| 151679 ||  || — || January 5, 2003 || Socorro || LINEAR || DOR || align=right | 3.8 km || 
|-id=680 bgcolor=#fefefe
| 151680 ||  || — || January 4, 2003 || Socorro || LINEAR || — || align=right | 1.7 km || 
|-id=681 bgcolor=#fefefe
| 151681 ||  || — || January 4, 2003 || Socorro || LINEAR || NYS || align=right | 1.0 km || 
|-id=682 bgcolor=#fefefe
| 151682 ||  || — || January 4, 2003 || Socorro || LINEAR || MAS || align=right | 1.4 km || 
|-id=683 bgcolor=#fefefe
| 151683 ||  || — || January 4, 2003 || Socorro || LINEAR || NYS || align=right | 1.2 km || 
|-id=684 bgcolor=#fefefe
| 151684 ||  || — || January 4, 2003 || Socorro || LINEAR || NYS || align=right | 1.1 km || 
|-id=685 bgcolor=#E9E9E9
| 151685 ||  || — || January 7, 2003 || Socorro || LINEAR || — || align=right | 4.5 km || 
|-id=686 bgcolor=#fefefe
| 151686 ||  || — || January 7, 2003 || Socorro || LINEAR || V || align=right | 1.8 km || 
|-id=687 bgcolor=#fefefe
| 151687 ||  || — || January 7, 2003 || Socorro || LINEAR || — || align=right | 1.6 km || 
|-id=688 bgcolor=#d6d6d6
| 151688 ||  || — || January 5, 2003 || Socorro || LINEAR || — || align=right | 3.8 km || 
|-id=689 bgcolor=#E9E9E9
| 151689 ||  || — || January 5, 2003 || Socorro || LINEAR || — || align=right | 1.9 km || 
|-id=690 bgcolor=#fefefe
| 151690 ||  || — || January 5, 2003 || Socorro || LINEAR || NYS || align=right | 1.1 km || 
|-id=691 bgcolor=#E9E9E9
| 151691 ||  || — || January 5, 2003 || Socorro || LINEAR || — || align=right | 2.8 km || 
|-id=692 bgcolor=#fefefe
| 151692 ||  || — || January 5, 2003 || Socorro || LINEAR || V || align=right | 1.2 km || 
|-id=693 bgcolor=#fefefe
| 151693 ||  || — || January 5, 2003 || Socorro || LINEAR || — || align=right | 1.6 km || 
|-id=694 bgcolor=#fefefe
| 151694 ||  || — || January 5, 2003 || Socorro || LINEAR || — || align=right | 2.6 km || 
|-id=695 bgcolor=#fefefe
| 151695 ||  || — || January 7, 2003 || Bisei SG Center || BATTeRS || V || align=right | 1.1 km || 
|-id=696 bgcolor=#fefefe
| 151696 ||  || — || January 7, 2003 || Socorro || LINEAR || — || align=right | 1.8 km || 
|-id=697 bgcolor=#fefefe
| 151697 Paolobattaini ||  ||  || January 15, 2003 || Schiaparelli || L. Buzzi, F. Bellini || NYS || align=right | 1.1 km || 
|-id=698 bgcolor=#fefefe
| 151698 ||  || — || January 14, 2003 || Campo Imperatore || CINEOS || NYS || align=right | 1.8 km || 
|-id=699 bgcolor=#E9E9E9
| 151699 ||  || — || January 10, 2003 || Socorro || LINEAR || — || align=right | 2.3 km || 
|-id=700 bgcolor=#fefefe
| 151700 ||  || — || January 27, 2003 || Socorro || LINEAR || MAS || align=right | 1.2 km || 
|}

151701–151800 

|-bgcolor=#fefefe
| 151701 ||  || — || January 27, 2003 || Socorro || LINEAR || — || align=right | 1.1 km || 
|-id=702 bgcolor=#d6d6d6
| 151702 ||  || — || January 27, 2003 || Socorro || LINEAR || — || align=right | 6.9 km || 
|-id=703 bgcolor=#FA8072
| 151703 ||  || — || January 27, 2003 || Haleakala || NEAT || — || align=right | 1.9 km || 
|-id=704 bgcolor=#fefefe
| 151704 ||  || — || January 26, 2003 || Palomar || NEAT || — || align=right | 4.2 km || 
|-id=705 bgcolor=#d6d6d6
| 151705 ||  || — || January 27, 2003 || Socorro || LINEAR || — || align=right | 3.9 km || 
|-id=706 bgcolor=#E9E9E9
| 151706 ||  || — || January 28, 2003 || Socorro || LINEAR || EUN || align=right | 2.2 km || 
|-id=707 bgcolor=#fefefe
| 151707 ||  || — || January 26, 2003 || Haleakala || NEAT || — || align=right | 1.2 km || 
|-id=708 bgcolor=#fefefe
| 151708 ||  || — || January 27, 2003 || Anderson Mesa || LONEOS || NYS || align=right | 1.2 km || 
|-id=709 bgcolor=#E9E9E9
| 151709 ||  || — || January 28, 2003 || Kitt Peak || Spacewatch || — || align=right | 1.8 km || 
|-id=710 bgcolor=#fefefe
| 151710 ||  || — || January 27, 2003 || Socorro || LINEAR || NYS || align=right | 1.6 km || 
|-id=711 bgcolor=#E9E9E9
| 151711 ||  || — || January 27, 2003 || Socorro || LINEAR || — || align=right | 1.2 km || 
|-id=712 bgcolor=#fefefe
| 151712 ||  || — || January 27, 2003 || Haleakala || NEAT || MAS || align=right | 1.2 km || 
|-id=713 bgcolor=#E9E9E9
| 151713 ||  || — || January 27, 2003 || Haleakala || NEAT || — || align=right | 2.1 km || 
|-id=714 bgcolor=#fefefe
| 151714 ||  || — || January 27, 2003 || Socorro || LINEAR || V || align=right | 1.3 km || 
|-id=715 bgcolor=#fefefe
| 151715 ||  || — || January 28, 2003 || Palomar || NEAT || — || align=right | 2.6 km || 
|-id=716 bgcolor=#fefefe
| 151716 ||  || — || January 26, 2003 || Anderson Mesa || LONEOS || — || align=right | 2.1 km || 
|-id=717 bgcolor=#fefefe
| 151717 ||  || — || January 27, 2003 || Anderson Mesa || LONEOS || MAS || align=right | 3.0 km || 
|-id=718 bgcolor=#E9E9E9
| 151718 ||  || — || January 27, 2003 || Anderson Mesa || LONEOS || — || align=right | 1.8 km || 
|-id=719 bgcolor=#E9E9E9
| 151719 ||  || — || January 29, 2003 || Palomar || NEAT || — || align=right | 1.9 km || 
|-id=720 bgcolor=#fefefe
| 151720 ||  || — || January 27, 2003 || Socorro || LINEAR || NYS || align=right | 1.1 km || 
|-id=721 bgcolor=#E9E9E9
| 151721 ||  || — || January 27, 2003 || Socorro || LINEAR || — || align=right | 1.7 km || 
|-id=722 bgcolor=#fefefe
| 151722 ||  || — || January 28, 2003 || Socorro || LINEAR || NYS || align=right data-sort-value="0.93" | 930 m || 
|-id=723 bgcolor=#FA8072
| 151723 ||  || — || January 28, 2003 || Socorro || LINEAR || — || align=right | 2.5 km || 
|-id=724 bgcolor=#fefefe
| 151724 ||  || — || January 30, 2003 || Socorro || LINEAR || CHL || align=right | 3.2 km || 
|-id=725 bgcolor=#fefefe
| 151725 ||  || — || January 28, 2003 || Haleakala || NEAT || NYS || align=right | 1.2 km || 
|-id=726 bgcolor=#E9E9E9
| 151726 ||  || — || January 29, 2003 || Palomar || NEAT || — || align=right | 1.9 km || 
|-id=727 bgcolor=#E9E9E9
| 151727 ||  || — || January 31, 2003 || Socorro || LINEAR || RAF || align=right | 1.7 km || 
|-id=728 bgcolor=#fefefe
| 151728 ||  || — || January 31, 2003 || Socorro || LINEAR || ERI || align=right | 3.3 km || 
|-id=729 bgcolor=#E9E9E9
| 151729 ||  || — || January 31, 2003 || Socorro || LINEAR || EUN || align=right | 1.8 km || 
|-id=730 bgcolor=#E9E9E9
| 151730 ||  || — || January 30, 2003 || Anderson Mesa || LONEOS || — || align=right | 1.8 km || 
|-id=731 bgcolor=#fefefe
| 151731 ||  || — || January 23, 2003 || Kitt Peak || Spacewatch || V || align=right | 1.3 km || 
|-id=732 bgcolor=#fefefe
| 151732 ||  || — || January 26, 2003 || Kitt Peak || Spacewatch || — || align=right | 1.5 km || 
|-id=733 bgcolor=#fefefe
| 151733 ||  || — || January 27, 2003 || Socorro || LINEAR || NYS || align=right | 1.1 km || 
|-id=734 bgcolor=#d6d6d6
| 151734 ||  || — || January 28, 2003 || Kitt Peak || Spacewatch || K-2 || align=right | 2.3 km || 
|-id=735 bgcolor=#fefefe
| 151735 ||  || — || January 30, 2003 || Anderson Mesa || LONEOS || NYS || align=right | 1.2 km || 
|-id=736 bgcolor=#fefefe
| 151736 || 2003 CQ || — || February 1, 2003 || Anderson Mesa || LONEOS || — || align=right | 4.6 km || 
|-id=737 bgcolor=#E9E9E9
| 151737 ||  || — || February 1, 2003 || Socorro || LINEAR || ADE || align=right | 2.9 km || 
|-id=738 bgcolor=#fefefe
| 151738 ||  || — || February 1, 2003 || Socorro || LINEAR || MAS || align=right | 1.4 km || 
|-id=739 bgcolor=#E9E9E9
| 151739 ||  || — || February 2, 2003 || Anderson Mesa || LONEOS || — || align=right | 2.2 km || 
|-id=740 bgcolor=#E9E9E9
| 151740 ||  || — || February 4, 2003 || Anderson Mesa || LONEOS || — || align=right | 5.1 km || 
|-id=741 bgcolor=#fefefe
| 151741 ||  || — || February 3, 2003 || Haleakala || NEAT || V || align=right data-sort-value="0.90" | 900 m || 
|-id=742 bgcolor=#E9E9E9
| 151742 ||  || — || February 9, 2003 || Palomar || NEAT || — || align=right | 1.3 km || 
|-id=743 bgcolor=#E9E9E9
| 151743 ||  || — || February 1, 2003 || Socorro || LINEAR || EUN || align=right | 2.1 km || 
|-id=744 bgcolor=#E9E9E9
| 151744 ||  || — || February 11, 2003 || Bergisch Gladbach || W. Bickel || EUN || align=right | 2.0 km || 
|-id=745 bgcolor=#E9E9E9
| 151745 ||  || — || February 22, 2003 || Palomar || NEAT || MAR || align=right | 1.5 km || 
|-id=746 bgcolor=#E9E9E9
| 151746 ||  || — || February 22, 2003 || Kitt Peak || Spacewatch || — || align=right | 2.0 km || 
|-id=747 bgcolor=#fefefe
| 151747 ||  || — || February 25, 2003 || Haleakala || NEAT || MAS || align=right | 1.2 km || 
|-id=748 bgcolor=#E9E9E9
| 151748 ||  || — || February 21, 2003 || Palomar || NEAT || — || align=right | 1.4 km || 
|-id=749 bgcolor=#fefefe
| 151749 ||  || — || February 19, 2003 || Palomar || NEAT || — || align=right | 1.7 km || 
|-id=750 bgcolor=#fefefe
| 151750 ||  || — || February 21, 2003 || Palomar || NEAT || MAS || align=right | 1.2 km || 
|-id=751 bgcolor=#E9E9E9
| 151751 ||  || — || February 21, 2003 || Palomar || NEAT || — || align=right | 1.4 km || 
|-id=752 bgcolor=#d6d6d6
| 151752 ||  || — || February 28, 2003 || Socorro || LINEAR || 628 || align=right | 3.0 km || 
|-id=753 bgcolor=#E9E9E9
| 151753 || 2003 EX || — || March 5, 2003 || Socorro || LINEAR || — || align=right | 4.8 km || 
|-id=754 bgcolor=#fefefe
| 151754 ||  || — || March 5, 2003 || Socorro || LINEAR || MAS || align=right | 1.2 km || 
|-id=755 bgcolor=#E9E9E9
| 151755 ||  || — || March 5, 2003 || Socorro || LINEAR || — || align=right | 2.3 km || 
|-id=756 bgcolor=#E9E9E9
| 151756 ||  || — || March 6, 2003 || Socorro || LINEAR || — || align=right | 2.2 km || 
|-id=757 bgcolor=#E9E9E9
| 151757 ||  || — || March 6, 2003 || Anderson Mesa || LONEOS || — || align=right | 1.7 km || 
|-id=758 bgcolor=#E9E9E9
| 151758 ||  || — || March 6, 2003 || Anderson Mesa || LONEOS || — || align=right | 1.4 km || 
|-id=759 bgcolor=#E9E9E9
| 151759 ||  || — || March 6, 2003 || Socorro || LINEAR || — || align=right | 1.8 km || 
|-id=760 bgcolor=#E9E9E9
| 151760 ||  || — || March 6, 2003 || Socorro || LINEAR || KON || align=right | 3.5 km || 
|-id=761 bgcolor=#E9E9E9
| 151761 ||  || — || March 6, 2003 || Socorro || LINEAR || — || align=right | 5.1 km || 
|-id=762 bgcolor=#E9E9E9
| 151762 ||  || — || March 6, 2003 || Socorro || LINEAR || — || align=right | 2.1 km || 
|-id=763 bgcolor=#E9E9E9
| 151763 ||  || — || March 6, 2003 || Socorro || LINEAR || — || align=right | 3.8 km || 
|-id=764 bgcolor=#E9E9E9
| 151764 ||  || — || March 6, 2003 || Socorro || LINEAR || — || align=right | 2.8 km || 
|-id=765 bgcolor=#E9E9E9
| 151765 ||  || — || March 6, 2003 || Anderson Mesa || LONEOS || — || align=right | 2.7 km || 
|-id=766 bgcolor=#E9E9E9
| 151766 ||  || — || March 6, 2003 || Anderson Mesa || LONEOS || — || align=right | 1.5 km || 
|-id=767 bgcolor=#E9E9E9
| 151767 ||  || — || March 6, 2003 || Anderson Mesa || LONEOS || — || align=right | 2.5 km || 
|-id=768 bgcolor=#E9E9E9
| 151768 ||  || — || March 6, 2003 || Socorro || LINEAR || MAR || align=right | 2.4 km || 
|-id=769 bgcolor=#E9E9E9
| 151769 ||  || — || March 6, 2003 || Socorro || LINEAR || — || align=right | 1.5 km || 
|-id=770 bgcolor=#E9E9E9
| 151770 ||  || — || March 6, 2003 || Socorro || LINEAR || — || align=right | 1.6 km || 
|-id=771 bgcolor=#E9E9E9
| 151771 ||  || — || March 6, 2003 || Socorro || LINEAR || — || align=right | 1.6 km || 
|-id=772 bgcolor=#E9E9E9
| 151772 ||  || — || March 6, 2003 || Anderson Mesa || LONEOS || — || align=right | 2.7 km || 
|-id=773 bgcolor=#E9E9E9
| 151773 ||  || — || March 6, 2003 || Anderson Mesa || LONEOS || — || align=right | 1.6 km || 
|-id=774 bgcolor=#fefefe
| 151774 ||  || — || March 6, 2003 || Palomar || NEAT || NYS || align=right | 1.3 km || 
|-id=775 bgcolor=#E9E9E9
| 151775 ||  || — || March 7, 2003 || Socorro || LINEAR || — || align=right | 2.8 km || 
|-id=776 bgcolor=#E9E9E9
| 151776 ||  || — || March 9, 2003 || Campo Imperatore || CINEOS || — || align=right | 1.9 km || 
|-id=777 bgcolor=#E9E9E9
| 151777 ||  || — || March 8, 2003 || Kitt Peak || Spacewatch || — || align=right | 2.7 km || 
|-id=778 bgcolor=#E9E9E9
| 151778 ||  || — || March 8, 2003 || Socorro || LINEAR || GER || align=right | 2.4 km || 
|-id=779 bgcolor=#E9E9E9
| 151779 ||  || — || March 9, 2003 || Socorro || LINEAR || RAF || align=right | 1.3 km || 
|-id=780 bgcolor=#E9E9E9
| 151780 ||  || — || March 9, 2003 || Anderson Mesa || LONEOS || — || align=right | 4.1 km || 
|-id=781 bgcolor=#E9E9E9
| 151781 ||  || — || March 10, 2003 || Anderson Mesa || LONEOS || AER || align=right | 2.0 km || 
|-id=782 bgcolor=#E9E9E9
| 151782 ||  || — || March 10, 2003 || Socorro || LINEAR || — || align=right | 2.5 km || 
|-id=783 bgcolor=#E9E9E9
| 151783 ||  || — || March 12, 2003 || Socorro || LINEAR || — || align=right | 3.6 km || 
|-id=784 bgcolor=#d6d6d6
| 151784 ||  || — || March 12, 2003 || Palomar || NEAT || — || align=right | 6.2 km || 
|-id=785 bgcolor=#E9E9E9
| 151785 ||  || — || March 25, 2003 || Haleakala || NEAT || HNS || align=right | 2.8 km || 
|-id=786 bgcolor=#E9E9E9
| 151786 ||  || — || March 23, 2003 || Kitt Peak || Spacewatch || AGN || align=right | 1.8 km || 
|-id=787 bgcolor=#E9E9E9
| 151787 ||  || — || March 24, 2003 || Kitt Peak || Spacewatch || — || align=right | 2.0 km || 
|-id=788 bgcolor=#E9E9E9
| 151788 ||  || — || March 23, 2003 || Catalina || CSS || — || align=right | 1.6 km || 
|-id=789 bgcolor=#E9E9E9
| 151789 ||  || — || March 23, 2003 || Kitt Peak || Spacewatch || — || align=right | 2.9 km || 
|-id=790 bgcolor=#E9E9E9
| 151790 ||  || — || March 23, 2003 || Kitt Peak || Spacewatch || — || align=right | 3.3 km || 
|-id=791 bgcolor=#E9E9E9
| 151791 ||  || — || March 23, 2003 || Kitt Peak || Spacewatch || MRX || align=right | 1.2 km || 
|-id=792 bgcolor=#E9E9E9
| 151792 ||  || — || March 23, 2003 || Kitt Peak || Spacewatch || — || align=right | 3.8 km || 
|-id=793 bgcolor=#E9E9E9
| 151793 ||  || — || March 26, 2003 || Kitt Peak || Spacewatch || — || align=right | 3.0 km || 
|-id=794 bgcolor=#E9E9E9
| 151794 ||  || — || March 23, 2003 || Catalina || CSS || — || align=right | 3.3 km || 
|-id=795 bgcolor=#E9E9E9
| 151795 ||  || — || March 24, 2003 || Kitt Peak || Spacewatch || — || align=right | 1.4 km || 
|-id=796 bgcolor=#E9E9E9
| 151796 ||  || — || March 24, 2003 || Kitt Peak || Spacewatch || — || align=right | 2.6 km || 
|-id=797 bgcolor=#E9E9E9
| 151797 ||  || — || March 25, 2003 || Haleakala || NEAT || — || align=right | 4.7 km || 
|-id=798 bgcolor=#E9E9E9
| 151798 ||  || — || March 25, 2003 || Haleakala || NEAT || — || align=right | 2.2 km || 
|-id=799 bgcolor=#E9E9E9
| 151799 ||  || — || March 26, 2003 || Palomar || NEAT || — || align=right | 3.5 km || 
|-id=800 bgcolor=#E9E9E9
| 151800 ||  || — || March 26, 2003 || Palomar || NEAT || — || align=right | 2.6 km || 
|}

151801–151900 

|-bgcolor=#E9E9E9
| 151801 ||  || — || March 26, 2003 || Palomar || NEAT || — || align=right | 2.0 km || 
|-id=802 bgcolor=#E9E9E9
| 151802 ||  || — || March 26, 2003 || Kitt Peak || Spacewatch || HNS || align=right | 1.9 km || 
|-id=803 bgcolor=#E9E9E9
| 151803 ||  || — || March 26, 2003 || Palomar || NEAT || — || align=right | 1.5 km || 
|-id=804 bgcolor=#E9E9E9
| 151804 ||  || — || March 26, 2003 || Palomar || NEAT || — || align=right | 1.9 km || 
|-id=805 bgcolor=#E9E9E9
| 151805 ||  || — || March 26, 2003 || Palomar || NEAT || — || align=right | 1.7 km || 
|-id=806 bgcolor=#E9E9E9
| 151806 ||  || — || March 26, 2003 || Palomar || NEAT || — || align=right | 4.0 km || 
|-id=807 bgcolor=#E9E9E9
| 151807 ||  || — || March 27, 2003 || Campo Imperatore || CINEOS || — || align=right | 1.6 km || 
|-id=808 bgcolor=#E9E9E9
| 151808 ||  || — || March 27, 2003 || Palomar || NEAT || — || align=right | 2.1 km || 
|-id=809 bgcolor=#E9E9E9
| 151809 ||  || — || March 27, 2003 || Kitt Peak || Spacewatch || — || align=right | 3.9 km || 
|-id=810 bgcolor=#E9E9E9
| 151810 ||  || — || March 27, 2003 || Kitt Peak || Spacewatch || GEF || align=right | 2.5 km || 
|-id=811 bgcolor=#E9E9E9
| 151811 ||  || — || March 27, 2003 || Palomar || NEAT || — || align=right | 3.5 km || 
|-id=812 bgcolor=#E9E9E9
| 151812 ||  || — || March 28, 2003 || Anderson Mesa || LONEOS || HNS || align=right | 2.2 km || 
|-id=813 bgcolor=#E9E9E9
| 151813 ||  || — || March 28, 2003 || Kitt Peak || Spacewatch || — || align=right | 1.9 km || 
|-id=814 bgcolor=#E9E9E9
| 151814 ||  || — || March 28, 2003 || Palomar || NEAT || ADE || align=right | 4.3 km || 
|-id=815 bgcolor=#E9E9E9
| 151815 ||  || — || March 29, 2003 || Anderson Mesa || LONEOS || — || align=right | 1.7 km || 
|-id=816 bgcolor=#E9E9E9
| 151816 ||  || — || March 29, 2003 || Anderson Mesa || LONEOS || — || align=right | 3.8 km || 
|-id=817 bgcolor=#E9E9E9
| 151817 ||  || — || March 29, 2003 || Anderson Mesa || LONEOS || — || align=right | 2.3 km || 
|-id=818 bgcolor=#E9E9E9
| 151818 ||  || — || March 29, 2003 || Anderson Mesa || LONEOS || MAR || align=right | 1.9 km || 
|-id=819 bgcolor=#E9E9E9
| 151819 ||  || — || March 29, 2003 || Anderson Mesa || LONEOS || ADE || align=right | 5.2 km || 
|-id=820 bgcolor=#E9E9E9
| 151820 ||  || — || March 30, 2003 || Kitt Peak || Spacewatch || MAR || align=right | 2.2 km || 
|-id=821 bgcolor=#E9E9E9
| 151821 ||  || — || March 30, 2003 || Kitt Peak || Spacewatch || — || align=right | 3.0 km || 
|-id=822 bgcolor=#E9E9E9
| 151822 ||  || — || March 30, 2003 || Socorro || LINEAR || — || align=right | 1.8 km || 
|-id=823 bgcolor=#E9E9E9
| 151823 ||  || — || March 30, 2003 || Socorro || LINEAR || — || align=right | 4.6 km || 
|-id=824 bgcolor=#E9E9E9
| 151824 ||  || — || March 31, 2003 || Anderson Mesa || LONEOS || — || align=right | 4.4 km || 
|-id=825 bgcolor=#fefefe
| 151825 ||  || — || March 31, 2003 || Socorro || LINEAR || — || align=right | 1.3 km || 
|-id=826 bgcolor=#E9E9E9
| 151826 ||  || — || March 25, 2003 || Haleakala || NEAT || — || align=right | 2.2 km || 
|-id=827 bgcolor=#E9E9E9
| 151827 ||  || — || March 27, 2003 || Anderson Mesa || LONEOS || ADE || align=right | 5.9 km || 
|-id=828 bgcolor=#E9E9E9
| 151828 ||  || — || March 30, 2003 || Socorro || LINEAR || — || align=right | 4.4 km || 
|-id=829 bgcolor=#d6d6d6
| 151829 ||  || — || March 31, 2003 || Anderson Mesa || LONEOS || HYG || align=right | 5.3 km || 
|-id=830 bgcolor=#E9E9E9
| 151830 ||  || — || March 31, 2003 || Kitt Peak || Spacewatch || JUN || align=right | 1.4 km || 
|-id=831 bgcolor=#E9E9E9
| 151831 ||  || — || March 31, 2003 || Socorro || LINEAR || — || align=right | 4.2 km || 
|-id=832 bgcolor=#E9E9E9
| 151832 ||  || — || March 25, 2003 || Palomar || NEAT || — || align=right | 2.1 km || 
|-id=833 bgcolor=#E9E9E9
| 151833 ||  || — || March 23, 2003 || Goodricke-Pigott || Goodricke-Pigott Obs. || — || align=right | 2.5 km || 
|-id=834 bgcolor=#E9E9E9
| 151834 Mongkut ||  ||  || March 26, 2003 || Goodricke-Pigott || V. Reddy || — || align=right | 3.4 km || 
|-id=835 bgcolor=#E9E9E9
| 151835 Christinarichey ||  ||  || March 27, 2003 || Goodricke-Pigott || V. Reddy || — || align=right | 2.2 km || 
|-id=836 bgcolor=#E9E9E9
| 151836 ||  || — || March 31, 2003 || Kitt Peak || Spacewatch || — || align=right | 1.4 km || 
|-id=837 bgcolor=#E9E9E9
| 151837 ||  || — || March 25, 2003 || Kitt Peak || Spacewatch || — || align=right | 3.0 km || 
|-id=838 bgcolor=#E9E9E9
| 151838 ||  || — || April 1, 2003 || Socorro || LINEAR || — || align=right | 2.5 km || 
|-id=839 bgcolor=#E9E9E9
| 151839 ||  || — || April 1, 2003 || Socorro || LINEAR || WIT || align=right | 1.7 km || 
|-id=840 bgcolor=#E9E9E9
| 151840 ||  || — || April 1, 2003 || Socorro || LINEAR || INO || align=right | 2.0 km || 
|-id=841 bgcolor=#E9E9E9
| 151841 ||  || — || April 1, 2003 || Socorro || LINEAR || — || align=right | 3.6 km || 
|-id=842 bgcolor=#E9E9E9
| 151842 ||  || — || April 2, 2003 || Socorro || LINEAR || — || align=right | 1.9 km || 
|-id=843 bgcolor=#E9E9E9
| 151843 ||  || — || April 1, 2003 || Socorro || LINEAR || — || align=right | 2.7 km || 
|-id=844 bgcolor=#d6d6d6
| 151844 ||  || — || April 4, 2003 || Kitt Peak || Spacewatch || KOR || align=right | 1.7 km || 
|-id=845 bgcolor=#E9E9E9
| 151845 ||  || — || April 3, 2003 || Haleakala || NEAT || — || align=right | 4.9 km || 
|-id=846 bgcolor=#E9E9E9
| 151846 ||  || — || April 4, 2003 || Haleakala || NEAT || — || align=right | 2.2 km || 
|-id=847 bgcolor=#d6d6d6
| 151847 ||  || — || April 3, 2003 || Anderson Mesa || LONEOS || — || align=right | 2.6 km || 
|-id=848 bgcolor=#E9E9E9
| 151848 ||  || — || April 4, 2003 || Kitt Peak || Spacewatch || — || align=right | 2.7 km || 
|-id=849 bgcolor=#d6d6d6
| 151849 ||  || — || April 7, 2003 || Socorro || LINEAR || — || align=right | 3.6 km || 
|-id=850 bgcolor=#E9E9E9
| 151850 ||  || — || April 7, 2003 || Palomar || NEAT || — || align=right | 3.4 km || 
|-id=851 bgcolor=#E9E9E9
| 151851 ||  || — || April 6, 2003 || Anderson Mesa || LONEOS || — || align=right | 2.1 km || 
|-id=852 bgcolor=#E9E9E9
| 151852 ||  || — || April 6, 2003 || Anderson Mesa || LONEOS || ADE || align=right | 3.3 km || 
|-id=853 bgcolor=#E9E9E9
| 151853 ||  || — || April 9, 2003 || Palomar || NEAT || JUN || align=right | 2.1 km || 
|-id=854 bgcolor=#E9E9E9
| 151854 ||  || — || April 22, 2003 || Catalina || CSS || — || align=right | 2.6 km || 
|-id=855 bgcolor=#E9E9E9
| 151855 ||  || — || April 25, 2003 || Kitt Peak || Spacewatch || — || align=right | 3.9 km || 
|-id=856 bgcolor=#E9E9E9
| 151856 ||  || — || April 24, 2003 || Anderson Mesa || LONEOS || PAD || align=right | 2.5 km || 
|-id=857 bgcolor=#E9E9E9
| 151857 ||  || — || April 26, 2003 || Kitt Peak || Spacewatch || HEN || align=right | 1.5 km || 
|-id=858 bgcolor=#E9E9E9
| 151858 ||  || — || April 26, 2003 || Haleakala || NEAT || — || align=right | 4.7 km || 
|-id=859 bgcolor=#E9E9E9
| 151859 ||  || — || April 25, 2003 || Kitt Peak || Spacewatch || — || align=right | 2.3 km || 
|-id=860 bgcolor=#d6d6d6
| 151860 ||  || — || April 26, 2003 || Kitt Peak || Spacewatch || KOR || align=right | 2.1 km || 
|-id=861 bgcolor=#E9E9E9
| 151861 ||  || — || April 27, 2003 || Anderson Mesa || LONEOS || — || align=right | 3.5 km || 
|-id=862 bgcolor=#E9E9E9
| 151862 ||  || — || April 28, 2003 || Socorro || LINEAR || — || align=right | 5.1 km || 
|-id=863 bgcolor=#E9E9E9
| 151863 ||  || — || April 29, 2003 || Haleakala || NEAT || — || align=right | 3.1 km || 
|-id=864 bgcolor=#E9E9E9
| 151864 ||  || — || April 29, 2003 || Haleakala || NEAT || — || align=right | 2.5 km || 
|-id=865 bgcolor=#E9E9E9
| 151865 ||  || — || April 29, 2003 || Anderson Mesa || LONEOS || — || align=right | 3.3 km || 
|-id=866 bgcolor=#d6d6d6
| 151866 ||  || — || April 30, 2003 || Socorro || LINEAR || BRA || align=right | 3.4 km || 
|-id=867 bgcolor=#E9E9E9
| 151867 ||  || — || April 24, 2003 || Anderson Mesa || LONEOS || — || align=right | 4.7 km || 
|-id=868 bgcolor=#E9E9E9
| 151868 ||  || — || April 24, 2003 || Haleakala || NEAT || — || align=right | 3.4 km || 
|-id=869 bgcolor=#d6d6d6
| 151869 || 2003 JZ || — || May 1, 2003 || Kitt Peak || Spacewatch || CHA || align=right | 3.1 km || 
|-id=870 bgcolor=#d6d6d6
| 151870 ||  || — || May 1, 2003 || Kitt Peak || Spacewatch || KOR || align=right | 2.3 km || 
|-id=871 bgcolor=#E9E9E9
| 151871 ||  || — || May 5, 2003 || Socorro || LINEAR || — || align=right | 3.2 km || 
|-id=872 bgcolor=#E9E9E9
| 151872 ||  || — || May 8, 2003 || Socorro || LINEAR || — || align=right | 4.1 km || 
|-id=873 bgcolor=#E9E9E9
| 151873 ||  || — || May 24, 2003 || Reedy Creek || J. Broughton || — || align=right | 3.6 km || 
|-id=874 bgcolor=#E9E9E9
| 151874 ||  || — || May 27, 2003 || Anderson Mesa || LONEOS || — || align=right | 2.3 km || 
|-id=875 bgcolor=#E9E9E9
| 151875 ||  || — || May 20, 2003 || Nogales || Tenagra II Obs. || — || align=right | 2.8 km || 
|-id=876 bgcolor=#d6d6d6
| 151876 ||  || — || July 7, 2003 || Reedy Creek || J. Broughton || JLI || align=right | 5.9 km || 
|-id=877 bgcolor=#d6d6d6
| 151877 ||  || — || July 25, 2003 || Socorro || LINEAR || — || align=right | 6.9 km || 
|-id=878 bgcolor=#d6d6d6
| 151878 ||  || — || August 4, 2003 || Socorro || LINEAR || — || align=right | 4.2 km || 
|-id=879 bgcolor=#d6d6d6
| 151879 ||  || — || September 1, 2003 || Socorro || LINEAR || — || align=right | 5.2 km || 
|-id=880 bgcolor=#d6d6d6
| 151880 ||  || — || September 17, 2003 || Socorro || LINEAR || URS || align=right | 7.6 km || 
|-id=881 bgcolor=#d6d6d6
| 151881 ||  || — || September 24, 2003 || Palomar || NEAT || ALA || align=right | 5.9 km || 
|-id=882 bgcolor=#fefefe
| 151882 ||  || — || October 18, 2003 || Anderson Mesa || LONEOS || — || align=right | 1.2 km || 
|-id=883 bgcolor=#C2FFFF
| 151883 ||  || — || November 21, 2003 || Socorro || LINEAR || L5 || align=right | 14 km || 
|-id=884 bgcolor=#C2FFFF
| 151884 ||  || — || November 19, 2003 || Kitt Peak || Spacewatch || L5 || align=right | 16 km || 
|-id=885 bgcolor=#fefefe
| 151885 ||  || — || December 15, 2003 || Nogales || Tenagra II Obs. || — || align=right | 1.3 km || 
|-id=886 bgcolor=#fefefe
| 151886 ||  || — || December 17, 2003 || Catalina || CSS || — || align=right | 1.3 km || 
|-id=887 bgcolor=#fefefe
| 151887 ||  || — || December 19, 2003 || Socorro || LINEAR || FLO || align=right | 1.1 km || 
|-id=888 bgcolor=#FA8072
| 151888 ||  || — || December 27, 2003 || Socorro || LINEAR || — || align=right | 2.1 km || 
|-id=889 bgcolor=#fefefe
| 151889 ||  || — || January 16, 2004 || Palomar || NEAT || — || align=right | 1.7 km || 
|-id=890 bgcolor=#fefefe
| 151890 ||  || — || January 24, 2004 || Socorro || LINEAR || — || align=right | 1.3 km || 
|-id=891 bgcolor=#d6d6d6
| 151891 ||  || — || January 24, 2004 || Socorro || LINEAR || — || align=right | 4.6 km || 
|-id=892 bgcolor=#E9E9E9
| 151892 ||  || — || January 25, 2004 || Haleakala || NEAT || — || align=right | 3.7 km || 
|-id=893 bgcolor=#fefefe
| 151893 ||  || — || January 26, 2004 || Anderson Mesa || LONEOS || — || align=right | 1.4 km || 
|-id=894 bgcolor=#fefefe
| 151894 ||  || — || February 12, 2004 || Palomar || NEAT || FLO || align=right data-sort-value="0.87" | 870 m || 
|-id=895 bgcolor=#fefefe
| 151895 ||  || — || February 15, 2004 || Socorro || LINEAR || V || align=right data-sort-value="0.94" | 940 m || 
|-id=896 bgcolor=#fefefe
| 151896 ||  || — || February 17, 2004 || Kitt Peak || Spacewatch || — || align=right | 1.3 km || 
|-id=897 bgcolor=#fefefe
| 151897 ||  || — || February 17, 2004 || Haleakala || NEAT || NYS || align=right | 1.2 km || 
|-id=898 bgcolor=#d6d6d6
| 151898 ||  || — || February 18, 2004 || Socorro || LINEAR || 627 || align=right | 4.7 km || 
|-id=899 bgcolor=#fefefe
| 151899 || 2004 EP || — || March 11, 2004 || Palomar || NEAT || — || align=right | 1.5 km || 
|-id=900 bgcolor=#fefefe
| 151900 ||  || — || March 12, 2004 || Palomar || NEAT || — || align=right data-sort-value="0.90" | 900 m || 
|}

151901–152000 

|-bgcolor=#fefefe
| 151901 ||  || — || March 11, 2004 || Palomar || NEAT || NYS || align=right data-sort-value="0.98" | 980 m || 
|-id=902 bgcolor=#fefefe
| 151902 ||  || — || March 14, 2004 || Kitt Peak || Spacewatch || — || align=right | 1.1 km || 
|-id=903 bgcolor=#d6d6d6
| 151903 ||  || — || March 11, 2004 || Palomar || NEAT || THB || align=right | 4.0 km || 
|-id=904 bgcolor=#fefefe
| 151904 ||  || — || March 12, 2004 || Palomar || NEAT || — || align=right data-sort-value="0.79" | 790 m || 
|-id=905 bgcolor=#fefefe
| 151905 ||  || — || March 15, 2004 || Kitt Peak || Spacewatch || NYS || align=right data-sort-value="0.84" | 840 m || 
|-id=906 bgcolor=#fefefe
| 151906 ||  || — || March 15, 2004 || Kitt Peak || Spacewatch || — || align=right data-sort-value="0.83" | 830 m || 
|-id=907 bgcolor=#fefefe
| 151907 ||  || — || March 14, 2004 || Catalina || CSS || FLO || align=right | 1.0 km || 
|-id=908 bgcolor=#fefefe
| 151908 ||  || — || March 14, 2004 || Kitt Peak || Spacewatch || — || align=right | 1.4 km || 
|-id=909 bgcolor=#fefefe
| 151909 ||  || — || March 15, 2004 || Kitt Peak || Spacewatch || — || align=right | 1.2 km || 
|-id=910 bgcolor=#fefefe
| 151910 ||  || — || March 15, 2004 || Socorro || LINEAR || NYS || align=right | 1.1 km || 
|-id=911 bgcolor=#fefefe
| 151911 ||  || — || March 15, 2004 || Catalina || CSS || — || align=right | 1.4 km || 
|-id=912 bgcolor=#fefefe
| 151912 ||  || — || March 15, 2004 || Catalina || CSS || — || align=right | 1.4 km || 
|-id=913 bgcolor=#fefefe
| 151913 ||  || — || March 13, 2004 || Palomar || NEAT || — || align=right | 1.3 km || 
|-id=914 bgcolor=#fefefe
| 151914 ||  || — || March 13, 2004 || Palomar || NEAT || — || align=right data-sort-value="0.97" | 970 m || 
|-id=915 bgcolor=#fefefe
| 151915 ||  || — || March 14, 2004 || Palomar || NEAT || — || align=right | 1.7 km || 
|-id=916 bgcolor=#fefefe
| 151916 ||  || — || March 15, 2004 || Kitt Peak || Spacewatch || — || align=right | 1.3 km || 
|-id=917 bgcolor=#fefefe
| 151917 ||  || — || March 15, 2004 || Socorro || LINEAR || — || align=right | 1.2 km || 
|-id=918 bgcolor=#fefefe
| 151918 ||  || — || March 14, 2004 || Palomar || NEAT || — || align=right | 1.8 km || 
|-id=919 bgcolor=#fefefe
| 151919 ||  || — || March 13, 2004 || Palomar || NEAT || — || align=right | 2.0 km || 
|-id=920 bgcolor=#fefefe
| 151920 ||  || — || March 15, 2004 || Catalina || CSS || — || align=right | 1.7 km || 
|-id=921 bgcolor=#fefefe
| 151921 ||  || — || March 15, 2004 || Catalina || CSS || — || align=right | 1.5 km || 
|-id=922 bgcolor=#E9E9E9
| 151922 ||  || — || March 15, 2004 || Kitt Peak || Spacewatch || — || align=right | 1.8 km || 
|-id=923 bgcolor=#fefefe
| 151923 ||  || — || March 15, 2004 || Catalina || CSS || — || align=right | 1.7 km || 
|-id=924 bgcolor=#fefefe
| 151924 ||  || — || March 15, 2004 || Kitt Peak || Spacewatch || — || align=right data-sort-value="0.80" | 800 m || 
|-id=925 bgcolor=#fefefe
| 151925 ||  || — || March 22, 2004 || Needville || J. Dellinger, A. Lowe || — || align=right | 1.0 km || 
|-id=926 bgcolor=#fefefe
| 151926 ||  || — || March 16, 2004 || Catalina || CSS || FLO || align=right | 1.0 km || 
|-id=927 bgcolor=#E9E9E9
| 151927 ||  || — || March 16, 2004 || Siding Spring || SSS || — || align=right | 1.9 km || 
|-id=928 bgcolor=#fefefe
| 151928 ||  || — || March 16, 2004 || Catalina || CSS || NYS || align=right data-sort-value="0.96" | 960 m || 
|-id=929 bgcolor=#fefefe
| 151929 ||  || — || March 16, 2004 || Catalina || CSS || — || align=right | 1.3 km || 
|-id=930 bgcolor=#d6d6d6
| 151930 ||  || — || March 16, 2004 || Socorro || LINEAR || HYG || align=right | 5.9 km || 
|-id=931 bgcolor=#fefefe
| 151931 ||  || — || March 17, 2004 || Socorro || LINEAR || — || align=right | 3.3 km || 
|-id=932 bgcolor=#fefefe
| 151932 ||  || — || March 17, 2004 || Kitt Peak || Spacewatch || — || align=right | 1.1 km || 
|-id=933 bgcolor=#fefefe
| 151933 ||  || — || March 17, 2004 || Kitt Peak || Spacewatch || — || align=right | 2.1 km || 
|-id=934 bgcolor=#fefefe
| 151934 ||  || — || March 16, 2004 || Kitt Peak || Spacewatch || — || align=right | 1.7 km || 
|-id=935 bgcolor=#fefefe
| 151935 ||  || — || March 16, 2004 || Socorro || LINEAR || — || align=right | 1.6 km || 
|-id=936 bgcolor=#fefefe
| 151936 ||  || — || March 16, 2004 || Socorro || LINEAR || FLO || align=right | 1.1 km || 
|-id=937 bgcolor=#fefefe
| 151937 ||  || — || March 19, 2004 || Socorro || LINEAR || FLO || align=right | 1.6 km || 
|-id=938 bgcolor=#fefefe
| 151938 ||  || — || March 19, 2004 || Socorro || LINEAR || — || align=right | 1.1 km || 
|-id=939 bgcolor=#fefefe
| 151939 ||  || — || March 19, 2004 || Socorro || LINEAR || — || align=right | 1.4 km || 
|-id=940 bgcolor=#fefefe
| 151940 ||  || — || March 22, 2004 || Socorro || LINEAR || MAS || align=right data-sort-value="0.97" | 970 m || 
|-id=941 bgcolor=#fefefe
| 151941 ||  || — || March 19, 2004 || Kitt Peak || Spacewatch || — || align=right | 1.0 km || 
|-id=942 bgcolor=#fefefe
| 151942 ||  || — || March 22, 2004 || Socorro || LINEAR || FLO || align=right data-sort-value="0.87" | 870 m || 
|-id=943 bgcolor=#fefefe
| 151943 ||  || — || March 22, 2004 || Socorro || LINEAR || — || align=right | 1.2 km || 
|-id=944 bgcolor=#fefefe
| 151944 ||  || — || March 23, 2004 || Socorro || LINEAR || — || align=right | 1.1 km || 
|-id=945 bgcolor=#fefefe
| 151945 ||  || — || March 20, 2004 || Socorro || LINEAR || — || align=right | 1.7 km || 
|-id=946 bgcolor=#fefefe
| 151946 ||  || — || March 23, 2004 || Socorro || LINEAR || — || align=right | 1.4 km || 
|-id=947 bgcolor=#fefefe
| 151947 ||  || — || March 27, 2004 || Catalina || CSS || — || align=right | 1.1 km || 
|-id=948 bgcolor=#fefefe
| 151948 ||  || — || March 22, 2004 || Socorro || LINEAR || — || align=right | 1.5 km || 
|-id=949 bgcolor=#E9E9E9
| 151949 ||  || — || March 27, 2004 || Socorro || LINEAR || HEN || align=right | 1.8 km || 
|-id=950 bgcolor=#fefefe
| 151950 ||  || — || March 27, 2004 || Socorro || LINEAR || — || align=right | 1.4 km || 
|-id=951 bgcolor=#fefefe
| 151951 ||  || — || March 22, 2004 || Anderson Mesa || LONEOS || — || align=right | 1.4 km || 
|-id=952 bgcolor=#fefefe
| 151952 ||  || — || March 25, 2004 || Anderson Mesa || LONEOS || — || align=right | 1.0 km || 
|-id=953 bgcolor=#E9E9E9
| 151953 ||  || — || March 29, 2004 || Kitt Peak || Spacewatch || — || align=right | 1.1 km || 
|-id=954 bgcolor=#fefefe
| 151954 ||  || — || April 10, 2004 || Palomar || NEAT || — || align=right | 2.9 km || 
|-id=955 bgcolor=#fefefe
| 151955 ||  || — || April 9, 2004 || Siding Spring || SSS || — || align=right data-sort-value="0.94" | 940 m || 
|-id=956 bgcolor=#fefefe
| 151956 ||  || — || April 10, 2004 || Catalina || CSS || — || align=right | 3.5 km || 
|-id=957 bgcolor=#fefefe
| 151957 ||  || — || April 13, 2004 || Catalina || CSS || — || align=right | 1.7 km || 
|-id=958 bgcolor=#E9E9E9
| 151958 ||  || — || April 10, 2004 || Palomar || NEAT || — || align=right | 4.3 km || 
|-id=959 bgcolor=#fefefe
| 151959 ||  || — || April 11, 2004 || Palomar || NEAT || — || align=right | 1.1 km || 
|-id=960 bgcolor=#fefefe
| 151960 ||  || — || April 13, 2004 || Catalina || CSS || — || align=right | 1.7 km || 
|-id=961 bgcolor=#fefefe
| 151961 ||  || — || April 12, 2004 || Anderson Mesa || LONEOS || FLO || align=right data-sort-value="0.89" | 890 m || 
|-id=962 bgcolor=#fefefe
| 151962 ||  || — || April 12, 2004 || Palomar || NEAT || V || align=right | 1.1 km || 
|-id=963 bgcolor=#fefefe
| 151963 ||  || — || April 12, 2004 || Anderson Mesa || LONEOS || FLO || align=right | 1.2 km || 
|-id=964 bgcolor=#fefefe
| 151964 ||  || — || April 15, 2004 || Anderson Mesa || LONEOS || NYS || align=right data-sort-value="0.81" | 810 m || 
|-id=965 bgcolor=#fefefe
| 151965 ||  || — || April 15, 2004 || Anderson Mesa || LONEOS || V || align=right | 1.3 km || 
|-id=966 bgcolor=#fefefe
| 151966 ||  || — || April 12, 2004 || Palomar || NEAT || — || align=right | 1.0 km || 
|-id=967 bgcolor=#E9E9E9
| 151967 ||  || — || April 13, 2004 || Palomar || NEAT || — || align=right | 1.6 km || 
|-id=968 bgcolor=#fefefe
| 151968 ||  || — || April 14, 2004 || Anderson Mesa || LONEOS || NYS || align=right data-sort-value="0.79" | 790 m || 
|-id=969 bgcolor=#fefefe
| 151969 ||  || — || April 15, 2004 || Catalina || CSS || — || align=right | 2.7 km || 
|-id=970 bgcolor=#fefefe
| 151970 ||  || — || April 13, 2004 || Palomar || NEAT || — || align=right | 1.0 km || 
|-id=971 bgcolor=#fefefe
| 151971 ||  || — || April 15, 2004 || Anderson Mesa || LONEOS || FLO || align=right | 1.0 km || 
|-id=972 bgcolor=#fefefe
| 151972 ||  || — || April 15, 2004 || Anderson Mesa || LONEOS || — || align=right | 2.7 km || 
|-id=973 bgcolor=#fefefe
| 151973 ||  || — || April 15, 2004 || Anderson Mesa || LONEOS || — || align=right | 1.2 km || 
|-id=974 bgcolor=#fefefe
| 151974 ||  || — || April 15, 2004 || Socorro || LINEAR || — || align=right | 1.3 km || 
|-id=975 bgcolor=#fefefe
| 151975 ||  || — || April 20, 2004 || Desert Eagle || W. K. Y. Yeung || V || align=right | 1.0 km || 
|-id=976 bgcolor=#fefefe
| 151976 ||  || — || April 17, 2004 || Socorro || LINEAR || — || align=right | 1.4 km || 
|-id=977 bgcolor=#fefefe
| 151977 ||  || — || April 17, 2004 || Socorro || LINEAR || — || align=right | 1.4 km || 
|-id=978 bgcolor=#fefefe
| 151978 ||  || — || April 17, 2004 || Socorro || LINEAR || — || align=right | 2.5 km || 
|-id=979 bgcolor=#fefefe
| 151979 ||  || — || April 17, 2004 || Socorro || LINEAR || — || align=right | 1.2 km || 
|-id=980 bgcolor=#fefefe
| 151980 ||  || — || April 17, 2004 || Socorro || LINEAR || — || align=right | 2.2 km || 
|-id=981 bgcolor=#fefefe
| 151981 ||  || — || April 19, 2004 || Socorro || LINEAR || FLO || align=right data-sort-value="0.96" | 960 m || 
|-id=982 bgcolor=#E9E9E9
| 151982 ||  || — || April 16, 2004 || Socorro || LINEAR || — || align=right | 4.2 km || 
|-id=983 bgcolor=#fefefe
| 151983 ||  || — || April 16, 2004 || Siding Spring || SSS || — || align=right | 1.00 km || 
|-id=984 bgcolor=#fefefe
| 151984 ||  || — || April 17, 2004 || Socorro || LINEAR || — || align=right | 1.3 km || 
|-id=985 bgcolor=#E9E9E9
| 151985 ||  || — || April 20, 2004 || Kitt Peak || Spacewatch || — || align=right | 2.9 km || 
|-id=986 bgcolor=#fefefe
| 151986 ||  || — || April 19, 2004 || Socorro || LINEAR || NYS || align=right | 1.2 km || 
|-id=987 bgcolor=#fefefe
| 151987 ||  || — || April 19, 2004 || Socorro || LINEAR || NYS || align=right | 2.2 km || 
|-id=988 bgcolor=#fefefe
| 151988 ||  || — || April 20, 2004 || Socorro || LINEAR || — || align=right | 1.2 km || 
|-id=989 bgcolor=#E9E9E9
| 151989 ||  || — || April 20, 2004 || Socorro || LINEAR || — || align=right | 1.6 km || 
|-id=990 bgcolor=#E9E9E9
| 151990 ||  || — || April 21, 2004 || Socorro || LINEAR || — || align=right | 1.4 km || 
|-id=991 bgcolor=#fefefe
| 151991 ||  || — || April 24, 2004 || Socorro || LINEAR || NYS || align=right | 1.0 km || 
|-id=992 bgcolor=#fefefe
| 151992 ||  || — || April 25, 2004 || Socorro || LINEAR || V || align=right | 1.1 km || 
|-id=993 bgcolor=#E9E9E9
| 151993 ||  || — || April 21, 2004 || Kitt Peak || Spacewatch || — || align=right | 1.2 km || 
|-id=994 bgcolor=#fefefe
| 151994 ||  || — || April 25, 2004 || Socorro || LINEAR || NYS || align=right data-sort-value="0.92" | 920 m || 
|-id=995 bgcolor=#fefefe
| 151995 ||  || — || April 29, 2004 || Socorro || LINEAR || V || align=right | 1.1 km || 
|-id=996 bgcolor=#fefefe
| 151996 ||  || — || April 17, 2004 || Socorro || LINEAR || — || align=right | 1.4 km || 
|-id=997 bgcolor=#fefefe
| 151997 Bauhinia ||  ||  || May 11, 2004 || Desert Eagle || W. K. Y. Yeung || — || align=right data-sort-value="0.87" | 870 m || 
|-id=998 bgcolor=#fefefe
| 151998 ||  || — || May 9, 2004 || Kitt Peak || Spacewatch || — || align=right | 1.1 km || 
|-id=999 bgcolor=#fefefe
| 151999 ||  || — || May 9, 2004 || Palomar || NEAT || MAS || align=right | 1.1 km || 
|-id=000 bgcolor=#fefefe
| 152000 ||  || — || May 13, 2004 || Anderson Mesa || LONEOS || NYS || align=right data-sort-value="0.82" | 820 m || 
|}

References

External links 
 Discovery Circumstances: Numbered Minor Planets (150001)–(155000) (IAU Minor Planet Center)

0151